

565001–565100 

|-bgcolor=#fefefe
| 565001 ||  || — || October 8, 2008 || Kitt Peak || Spacewatch ||  || align=right data-sort-value="0.74" | 740 m || 
|-id=002 bgcolor=#fefefe
| 565002 ||  || — || December 14, 2004 || Kitt Peak || Spacewatch ||  || align=right | 1.1 km || 
|-id=003 bgcolor=#fefefe
| 565003 ||  || — || November 17, 2009 || Mount Lemmon || Mount Lemmon Survey ||  || align=right data-sort-value="0.69" | 690 m || 
|-id=004 bgcolor=#fefefe
| 565004 ||  || — || August 20, 2001 || Cerro Tololo || Cerro Tololo Obs. ||  || align=right data-sort-value="0.73" | 730 m || 
|-id=005 bgcolor=#fefefe
| 565005 ||  || — || March 16, 2010 || Mount Lemmon || Mount Lemmon Survey ||  || align=right data-sort-value="0.73" | 730 m || 
|-id=006 bgcolor=#fefefe
| 565006 ||  || — || December 31, 2008 || Kitt Peak || Spacewatch ||  || align=right data-sort-value="0.79" | 790 m || 
|-id=007 bgcolor=#fefefe
| 565007 ||  || — || September 22, 2004 || Kitt Peak || Spacewatch ||  || align=right data-sort-value="0.95" | 950 m || 
|-id=008 bgcolor=#E9E9E9
| 565008 ||  || — || December 23, 2016 || Haleakala || Pan-STARRS ||  || align=right data-sort-value="0.96" | 960 m || 
|-id=009 bgcolor=#fefefe
| 565009 ||  || — || October 1, 2008 || Mount Lemmon || Mount Lemmon Survey ||  || align=right data-sort-value="0.79" | 790 m || 
|-id=010 bgcolor=#E9E9E9
| 565010 ||  || — || February 13, 2009 || Mount Lemmon || Mount Lemmon Survey ||  || align=right | 1.1 km || 
|-id=011 bgcolor=#fefefe
| 565011 ||  || — || April 5, 2003 || Kitt Peak || Spacewatch ||  || align=right data-sort-value="0.87" | 870 m || 
|-id=012 bgcolor=#E9E9E9
| 565012 ||  || — || April 14, 2005 || Catalina || CSS ||  || align=right | 1.3 km || 
|-id=013 bgcolor=#fefefe
| 565013 ||  || — || November 6, 2012 || Kitt Peak || Spacewatch ||  || align=right data-sort-value="0.68" | 680 m || 
|-id=014 bgcolor=#E9E9E9
| 565014 ||  || — || December 4, 2007 || Mount Lemmon || Mount Lemmon Survey ||  || align=right | 1.5 km || 
|-id=015 bgcolor=#E9E9E9
| 565015 ||  || — || November 15, 2006 || Catalina || CSS ||  || align=right | 2.8 km || 
|-id=016 bgcolor=#fefefe
| 565016 ||  || — || September 25, 2012 || Kitt Peak || Spacewatch ||  || align=right data-sort-value="0.60" | 600 m || 
|-id=017 bgcolor=#fefefe
| 565017 ||  || — || December 15, 2009 || Mount Lemmon || Mount Lemmon Survey ||  || align=right data-sort-value="0.87" | 870 m || 
|-id=018 bgcolor=#fefefe
| 565018 ||  || — || December 21, 2016 || Oukaimeden || M. Ory ||  || align=right data-sort-value="0.57" | 570 m || 
|-id=019 bgcolor=#fefefe
| 565019 ||  || — || November 30, 2008 || Kitt Peak || Spacewatch ||  || align=right data-sort-value="0.92" | 920 m || 
|-id=020 bgcolor=#fefefe
| 565020 ||  || — || October 19, 2000 || Kitt Peak || Spacewatch ||  || align=right data-sort-value="0.75" | 750 m || 
|-id=021 bgcolor=#fefefe
| 565021 ||  || — || October 8, 2012 || Kitt Peak || Spacewatch ||  || align=right data-sort-value="0.64" | 640 m || 
|-id=022 bgcolor=#fefefe
| 565022 ||  || — || January 10, 2007 || Mount Lemmon || Mount Lemmon Survey ||  || align=right data-sort-value="0.66" | 660 m || 
|-id=023 bgcolor=#E9E9E9
| 565023 ||  || — || October 23, 2011 || Haleakala || Pan-STARRS ||  || align=right | 1.3 km || 
|-id=024 bgcolor=#fefefe
| 565024 ||  || — || October 7, 2007 || Gaisberg || R. Gierlinger ||  || align=right | 1.2 km || 
|-id=025 bgcolor=#fefefe
| 565025 ||  || — || November 30, 2008 || Kitt Peak || Spacewatch ||  || align=right data-sort-value="0.70" | 700 m || 
|-id=026 bgcolor=#fefefe
| 565026 ||  || — || April 21, 2014 || Mount Lemmon || Mount Lemmon Survey ||  || align=right data-sort-value="0.73" | 730 m || 
|-id=027 bgcolor=#fefefe
| 565027 ||  || — || January 17, 2007 || Kitt Peak || Spacewatch ||  || align=right data-sort-value="0.67" | 670 m || 
|-id=028 bgcolor=#fefefe
| 565028 ||  || — || January 23, 2006 || Kitt Peak || Spacewatch ||  || align=right data-sort-value="0.57" | 570 m || 
|-id=029 bgcolor=#fefefe
| 565029 ||  || — || October 21, 2012 || Haleakala || Pan-STARRS ||  || align=right data-sort-value="0.79" | 790 m || 
|-id=030 bgcolor=#fefefe
| 565030 ||  || — || October 7, 2012 || Haleakala || Pan-STARRS ||  || align=right data-sort-value="0.62" | 620 m || 
|-id=031 bgcolor=#fefefe
| 565031 ||  || — || December 2, 2005 || Kitt Peak || Spacewatch ||  || align=right data-sort-value="0.75" | 750 m || 
|-id=032 bgcolor=#fefefe
| 565032 ||  || — || February 17, 2010 || Kitt Peak || Spacewatch ||  || align=right data-sort-value="0.54" | 540 m || 
|-id=033 bgcolor=#fefefe
| 565033 ||  || — || October 1, 2005 || Kitt Peak || Spacewatch ||  || align=right data-sort-value="0.46" | 460 m || 
|-id=034 bgcolor=#fefefe
| 565034 ||  || — || September 27, 2008 || Mount Lemmon || Mount Lemmon Survey ||  || align=right data-sort-value="0.86" | 860 m || 
|-id=035 bgcolor=#fefefe
| 565035 ||  || — || February 19, 2010 || Mount Lemmon || Mount Lemmon Survey ||  || align=right data-sort-value="0.62" | 620 m || 
|-id=036 bgcolor=#fefefe
| 565036 ||  || — || March 14, 2002 || Cima Ekar || Asiago Obs. ||  || align=right data-sort-value="0.96" | 960 m || 
|-id=037 bgcolor=#fefefe
| 565037 ||  || — || December 5, 2012 || Mount Lemmon || Mount Lemmon Survey ||  || align=right data-sort-value="0.80" | 800 m || 
|-id=038 bgcolor=#fefefe
| 565038 ||  || — || June 1, 2008 || Mount Lemmon || Mount Lemmon Survey ||  || align=right | 1.1 km || 
|-id=039 bgcolor=#fefefe
| 565039 ||  || — || December 15, 2004 || Mauna Kea || Mauna Kea Obs. ||  || align=right data-sort-value="0.66" | 660 m || 
|-id=040 bgcolor=#fefefe
| 565040 ||  || — || April 20, 2010 || Mount Lemmon || Mount Lemmon Survey ||  || align=right data-sort-value="0.73" | 730 m || 
|-id=041 bgcolor=#fefefe
| 565041 ||  || — || November 10, 2009 || Mount Lemmon || Mount Lemmon Survey ||  || align=right data-sort-value="0.65" | 650 m || 
|-id=042 bgcolor=#fefefe
| 565042 ||  || — || December 18, 2009 || Mount Lemmon || Mount Lemmon Survey ||  || align=right data-sort-value="0.60" | 600 m || 
|-id=043 bgcolor=#fefefe
| 565043 ||  || — || March 12, 1996 || Kitt Peak || Spacewatch ||  || align=right data-sort-value="0.78" | 780 m || 
|-id=044 bgcolor=#E9E9E9
| 565044 ||  || — || January 22, 2013 || Mount Lemmon || Mount Lemmon Survey ||  || align=right data-sort-value="0.78" | 780 m || 
|-id=045 bgcolor=#FA8072
| 565045 ||  || — || August 17, 2007 || XuYi || PMO NEO ||  || align=right | 1.6 km || 
|-id=046 bgcolor=#E9E9E9
| 565046 ||  || — || February 5, 2013 || ASC-Kislovodsk || ASC-Kislovodsk ||  || align=right | 1.1 km || 
|-id=047 bgcolor=#fefefe
| 565047 ||  || — || January 10, 2006 || Mount Lemmon || Mount Lemmon Survey ||  || align=right data-sort-value="0.97" | 970 m || 
|-id=048 bgcolor=#fefefe
| 565048 ||  || — || January 30, 2006 || Kitt Peak || Spacewatch ||  || align=right data-sort-value="0.75" | 750 m || 
|-id=049 bgcolor=#fefefe
| 565049 ||  || — || January 10, 2014 || Haleakala || Pan-STARRS ||  || align=right data-sort-value="0.93" | 930 m || 
|-id=050 bgcolor=#C2FFFF
| 565050 ||  || — || March 10, 2005 || Mount Lemmon || Mount Lemmon Survey || L5 || align=right | 11 km || 
|-id=051 bgcolor=#E9E9E9
| 565051 ||  || — || February 9, 2005 || Anderson Mesa || LONEOS ||  || align=right | 1.3 km || 
|-id=052 bgcolor=#fefefe
| 565052 ||  || — || December 25, 2009 || Kitt Peak || Spacewatch ||  || align=right data-sort-value="0.91" | 910 m || 
|-id=053 bgcolor=#fefefe
| 565053 ||  || — || March 19, 2007 || Mount Lemmon || Mount Lemmon Survey ||  || align=right | 1.1 km || 
|-id=054 bgcolor=#fefefe
| 565054 ||  || — || August 10, 2007 || Kitt Peak || Spacewatch ||  || align=right data-sort-value="0.87" | 870 m || 
|-id=055 bgcolor=#fefefe
| 565055 ||  || — || August 30, 2005 || Kitt Peak || Spacewatch ||  || align=right data-sort-value="0.97" | 970 m || 
|-id=056 bgcolor=#fefefe
| 565056 ||  || — || September 22, 2012 || Mount Lemmon || Mount Lemmon Survey ||  || align=right data-sort-value="0.56" | 560 m || 
|-id=057 bgcolor=#fefefe
| 565057 ||  || — || July 22, 2004 || Mauna Kea || Mauna Kea Obs. ||  || align=right data-sort-value="0.80" | 800 m || 
|-id=058 bgcolor=#E9E9E9
| 565058 ||  || — || January 20, 2008 || Mount Lemmon || Mount Lemmon Survey ||  || align=right | 1.6 km || 
|-id=059 bgcolor=#E9E9E9
| 565059 ||  || — || February 22, 2009 || Catalina || CSS ||  || align=right | 1.2 km || 
|-id=060 bgcolor=#fefefe
| 565060 ||  || — || February 16, 2004 || Kitt Peak || Spacewatch ||  || align=right data-sort-value="0.70" | 700 m || 
|-id=061 bgcolor=#fefefe
| 565061 ||  || — || February 13, 2010 || Mount Lemmon || Mount Lemmon Survey ||  || align=right data-sort-value="0.66" | 660 m || 
|-id=062 bgcolor=#fefefe
| 565062 ||  || — || January 21, 2017 || XuYi || PMO NEO ||  || align=right data-sort-value="0.91" | 910 m || 
|-id=063 bgcolor=#fefefe
| 565063 ||  || — || August 23, 2007 || Kitt Peak || Spacewatch ||  || align=right data-sort-value="0.95" | 950 m || 
|-id=064 bgcolor=#fefefe
| 565064 ||  || — || January 8, 2017 || Mount Lemmon || Mount Lemmon Survey ||  || align=right data-sort-value="0.53" | 530 m || 
|-id=065 bgcolor=#fefefe
| 565065 ||  || — || February 13, 2002 || Kitt Peak || Spacewatch ||  || align=right data-sort-value="0.64" | 640 m || 
|-id=066 bgcolor=#fefefe
| 565066 ||  || — || January 28, 2006 || Kitt Peak || Spacewatch ||  || align=right data-sort-value="0.58" | 580 m || 
|-id=067 bgcolor=#fefefe
| 565067 ||  || — || May 6, 2014 || Haleakala || Pan-STARRS ||  || align=right data-sort-value="0.69" | 690 m || 
|-id=068 bgcolor=#fefefe
| 565068 ||  || — || December 24, 2006 || Mount Lemmon || Mount Lemmon Survey ||  || align=right data-sort-value="0.70" | 700 m || 
|-id=069 bgcolor=#fefefe
| 565069 ||  || — || August 30, 2005 || Kitt Peak || Spacewatch ||  || align=right data-sort-value="0.68" | 680 m || 
|-id=070 bgcolor=#fefefe
| 565070 ||  || — || January 23, 2006 || Kitt Peak || Spacewatch ||  || align=right data-sort-value="0.68" | 680 m || 
|-id=071 bgcolor=#fefefe
| 565071 ||  || — || March 27, 2003 || Kitt Peak || Spacewatch ||  || align=right data-sort-value="0.62" | 620 m || 
|-id=072 bgcolor=#fefefe
| 565072 ||  || — || March 19, 1996 || Kitt Peak || Spacewatch ||  || align=right data-sort-value="0.67" | 670 m || 
|-id=073 bgcolor=#fefefe
| 565073 ||  || — || August 28, 2005 || Kitt Peak || Spacewatch ||  || align=right data-sort-value="0.76" | 760 m || 
|-id=074 bgcolor=#fefefe
| 565074 ||  || — || February 24, 1998 || Kitt Peak || Spacewatch ||  || align=right data-sort-value="0.81" | 810 m || 
|-id=075 bgcolor=#E9E9E9
| 565075 ||  || — || January 26, 2017 || Mount Lemmon || Mount Lemmon Survey ||  || align=right | 1.6 km || 
|-id=076 bgcolor=#fefefe
| 565076 ||  || — || February 1, 2006 || Kitt Peak || Spacewatch ||  || align=right data-sort-value="0.94" | 940 m || 
|-id=077 bgcolor=#fefefe
| 565077 ||  || — || April 7, 2014 || Mount Lemmon || Mount Lemmon Survey ||  || align=right data-sort-value="0.62" | 620 m || 
|-id=078 bgcolor=#fefefe
| 565078 ||  || — || December 1, 2005 || Cerro Tololo || L. H. Wasserman, R. Millis ||  || align=right data-sort-value="0.60" | 600 m || 
|-id=079 bgcolor=#fefefe
| 565079 ||  || — || February 20, 2006 || Whipple || Mount Lemmon Survey ||  || align=right data-sort-value="0.73" | 730 m || 
|-id=080 bgcolor=#fefefe
| 565080 ||  || — || November 29, 2005 || Mount Lemmon || Mount Lemmon Survey ||  || align=right data-sort-value="0.89" | 890 m || 
|-id=081 bgcolor=#fefefe
| 565081 ||  || — || November 7, 2012 || Haleakala || Pan-STARRS ||  || align=right data-sort-value="0.76" | 760 m || 
|-id=082 bgcolor=#fefefe
| 565082 ||  || — || October 17, 2012 || Haleakala || Pan-STARRS ||  || align=right data-sort-value="0.51" | 510 m || 
|-id=083 bgcolor=#fefefe
| 565083 ||  || — || July 4, 2005 || Mount Lemmon || Mount Lemmon Survey ||  || align=right data-sort-value="0.61" | 610 m || 
|-id=084 bgcolor=#fefefe
| 565084 ||  || — || February 7, 2006 || Kitt Peak || Spacewatch ||  || align=right data-sort-value="0.68" | 680 m || 
|-id=085 bgcolor=#fefefe
| 565085 ||  || — || February 16, 2010 || Kitt Peak || Spacewatch ||  || align=right data-sort-value="0.54" | 540 m || 
|-id=086 bgcolor=#fefefe
| 565086 ||  || — || December 29, 2005 || Kitt Peak || Spacewatch ||  || align=right data-sort-value="0.61" | 610 m || 
|-id=087 bgcolor=#E9E9E9
| 565087 ||  || — || February 7, 2013 || Catalina || CSS ||  || align=right | 2.1 km || 
|-id=088 bgcolor=#fefefe
| 565088 ||  || — || May 21, 2011 || Haleakala || Pan-STARRS ||  || align=right data-sort-value="0.87" | 870 m || 
|-id=089 bgcolor=#fefefe
| 565089 ||  || — || December 6, 2008 || Kitt Peak || Spacewatch ||  || align=right data-sort-value="0.83" | 830 m || 
|-id=090 bgcolor=#fefefe
| 565090 ||  || — || August 14, 2015 || Haleakala || Pan-STARRS ||  || align=right data-sort-value="0.68" | 680 m || 
|-id=091 bgcolor=#fefefe
| 565091 ||  || — || February 27, 2006 || Mount Lemmon || Mount Lemmon Survey ||  || align=right data-sort-value="0.60" | 600 m || 
|-id=092 bgcolor=#fefefe
| 565092 ||  || — || March 11, 2003 || Palomar || NEAT ||  || align=right data-sort-value="0.75" | 750 m || 
|-id=093 bgcolor=#fefefe
| 565093 ||  || — || October 23, 2004 || Kitt Peak || Spacewatch ||  || align=right | 1.1 km || 
|-id=094 bgcolor=#fefefe
| 565094 ||  || — || March 13, 2010 || Mount Lemmon || Mount Lemmon Survey ||  || align=right data-sort-value="0.58" | 580 m || 
|-id=095 bgcolor=#fefefe
| 565095 ||  || — || February 23, 2007 || Kitt Peak || Spacewatch ||  || align=right data-sort-value="0.68" | 680 m || 
|-id=096 bgcolor=#fefefe
| 565096 ||  || — || November 21, 2009 || Mount Lemmon || Mount Lemmon Survey ||  || align=right data-sort-value="0.88" | 880 m || 
|-id=097 bgcolor=#FA8072
| 565097 ||  || — || August 11, 2001 || Haleakala || AMOS ||  || align=right data-sort-value="0.90" | 900 m || 
|-id=098 bgcolor=#fefefe
| 565098 ||  || — || May 6, 2006 || Mount Lemmon || Mount Lemmon Survey ||  || align=right data-sort-value="0.88" | 880 m || 
|-id=099 bgcolor=#fefefe
| 565099 ||  || — || December 3, 2002 || Palomar || NEAT ||  || align=right data-sort-value="0.80" | 800 m || 
|-id=100 bgcolor=#fefefe
| 565100 ||  || — || February 17, 2010 || Kitt Peak || Spacewatch ||  || align=right data-sort-value="0.71" | 710 m || 
|}

565101–565200 

|-bgcolor=#fefefe
| 565101 ||  || — || October 2, 2008 || Kitt Peak || Spacewatch ||  || align=right data-sort-value="0.77" | 770 m || 
|-id=102 bgcolor=#fefefe
| 565102 ||  || — || January 7, 2010 || Kitt Peak || Spacewatch ||  || align=right data-sort-value="0.69" | 690 m || 
|-id=103 bgcolor=#fefefe
| 565103 ||  || — || November 10, 2004 || Kitt Peak || Spacewatch ||  || align=right data-sort-value="0.92" | 920 m || 
|-id=104 bgcolor=#fefefe
| 565104 ||  || — || August 14, 2012 || Haleakala || Pan-STARRS ||  || align=right data-sort-value="0.61" | 610 m || 
|-id=105 bgcolor=#fefefe
| 565105 ||  || — || November 6, 2005 || Mount Lemmon || Mount Lemmon Survey ||  || align=right data-sort-value="0.79" | 790 m || 
|-id=106 bgcolor=#fefefe
| 565106 ||  || — || December 8, 2012 || Kitt Peak || Spacewatch ||  || align=right data-sort-value="0.83" | 830 m || 
|-id=107 bgcolor=#fefefe
| 565107 ||  || — || September 24, 2008 || Kitt Peak || Spacewatch ||  || align=right data-sort-value="0.77" | 770 m || 
|-id=108 bgcolor=#fefefe
| 565108 ||  || — || January 12, 2010 || Catalina || CSS ||  || align=right data-sort-value="0.65" | 650 m || 
|-id=109 bgcolor=#fefefe
| 565109 ||  || — || November 7, 2012 || Kitt Peak || Spacewatch ||  || align=right data-sort-value="0.71" | 710 m || 
|-id=110 bgcolor=#fefefe
| 565110 ||  || — || March 20, 2010 || Kitt Peak || Spacewatch ||  || align=right data-sort-value="0.58" | 580 m || 
|-id=111 bgcolor=#fefefe
| 565111 ||  || — || August 25, 2005 || Palomar || NEAT ||  || align=right data-sort-value="0.69" | 690 m || 
|-id=112 bgcolor=#fefefe
| 565112 ||  || — || January 31, 2006 || Kitt Peak || Spacewatch ||  || align=right data-sort-value="0.63" | 630 m || 
|-id=113 bgcolor=#fefefe
| 565113 ||  || — || March 20, 2002 || Kitt Peak || Spacewatch ||  || align=right data-sort-value="0.79" | 790 m || 
|-id=114 bgcolor=#fefefe
| 565114 ||  || — || March 15, 2007 || Mount Lemmon || Mount Lemmon Survey ||  || align=right data-sort-value="0.69" | 690 m || 
|-id=115 bgcolor=#fefefe
| 565115 ||  || — || August 21, 2015 || Haleakala || Pan-STARRS ||  || align=right data-sort-value="0.67" | 670 m || 
|-id=116 bgcolor=#fefefe
| 565116 ||  || — || May 6, 2006 || Mount Lemmon || Mount Lemmon Survey ||  || align=right data-sort-value="0.83" | 830 m || 
|-id=117 bgcolor=#fefefe
| 565117 ||  || — || April 22, 2007 || Kitt Peak || Spacewatch ||  || align=right data-sort-value="0.50" | 500 m || 
|-id=118 bgcolor=#fefefe
| 565118 ||  || — || June 22, 2015 || Haleakala || Pan-STARRS ||  || align=right data-sort-value="0.55" | 550 m || 
|-id=119 bgcolor=#fefefe
| 565119 ||  || — || March 16, 2007 || Kitt Peak || Spacewatch ||  || align=right data-sort-value="0.63" | 630 m || 
|-id=120 bgcolor=#fefefe
| 565120 ||  || — || October 8, 2008 || Mount Lemmon || Mount Lemmon Survey ||  || align=right data-sort-value="0.80" | 800 m || 
|-id=121 bgcolor=#fefefe
| 565121 ||  || — || June 25, 2015 || Haleakala || Pan-STARRS ||  || align=right data-sort-value="0.57" | 570 m || 
|-id=122 bgcolor=#fefefe
| 565122 ||  || — || July 25, 2011 || Haleakala || Pan-STARRS ||  || align=right data-sort-value="0.64" | 640 m || 
|-id=123 bgcolor=#fefefe
| 565123 ||  || — || January 29, 2003 || Kitt Peak || Spacewatch ||  || align=right data-sort-value="0.60" | 600 m || 
|-id=124 bgcolor=#fefefe
| 565124 ||  || — || January 31, 2006 || Mount Lemmon || Mount Lemmon Survey ||  || align=right data-sort-value="0.76" | 760 m || 
|-id=125 bgcolor=#E9E9E9
| 565125 ||  || — || December 8, 2015 || Haleakala || Pan-STARRS ||  || align=right | 2.0 km || 
|-id=126 bgcolor=#E9E9E9
| 565126 ||  || — || July 8, 2014 || Haleakala || Pan-STARRS ||  || align=right | 1.3 km || 
|-id=127 bgcolor=#fefefe
| 565127 ||  || — || February 24, 2006 || Catalina || CSS ||  || align=right data-sort-value="0.87" | 870 m || 
|-id=128 bgcolor=#fefefe
| 565128 ||  || — || February 27, 2006 || Mount Lemmon || Mount Lemmon Survey ||  || align=right data-sort-value="0.69" | 690 m || 
|-id=129 bgcolor=#fefefe
| 565129 ||  || — || November 23, 2009 || Mount Lemmon || Mount Lemmon Survey ||  || align=right data-sort-value="0.83" | 830 m || 
|-id=130 bgcolor=#fefefe
| 565130 ||  || — || April 9, 2006 || Mount Lemmon || Mount Lemmon Survey ||  || align=right data-sort-value="0.96" | 960 m || 
|-id=131 bgcolor=#fefefe
| 565131 ||  || — || May 1, 2003 || Kitt Peak || Spacewatch ||  || align=right data-sort-value="0.81" | 810 m || 
|-id=132 bgcolor=#fefefe
| 565132 ||  || — || October 31, 2005 || Mount Lemmon || Mount Lemmon Survey ||  || align=right data-sort-value="0.95" | 950 m || 
|-id=133 bgcolor=#fefefe
| 565133 ||  || — || January 12, 2013 || Mount Lemmon || Mount Lemmon Survey ||  || align=right data-sort-value="0.77" | 770 m || 
|-id=134 bgcolor=#fefefe
| 565134 ||  || — || November 21, 2009 || Catalina || CSS ||  || align=right data-sort-value="0.83" | 830 m || 
|-id=135 bgcolor=#E9E9E9
| 565135 ||  || — || February 7, 2013 || Nogales || M. Schwartz, P. R. Holvorcem ||  || align=right | 1.2 km || 
|-id=136 bgcolor=#fefefe
| 565136 ||  || — || April 2, 2014 || Mount Lemmon || Mount Lemmon Survey ||  || align=right data-sort-value="0.56" | 560 m || 
|-id=137 bgcolor=#fefefe
| 565137 ||  || — || January 11, 2010 || Kitt Peak || Spacewatch ||  || align=right data-sort-value="0.60" | 600 m || 
|-id=138 bgcolor=#fefefe
| 565138 ||  || — || January 4, 2006 || Kitt Peak || Spacewatch ||  || align=right data-sort-value="0.51" | 510 m || 
|-id=139 bgcolor=#fefefe
| 565139 ||  || — || December 1, 2005 || Mount Lemmon || Mount Lemmon Survey ||  || align=right data-sort-value="0.61" | 610 m || 
|-id=140 bgcolor=#C2FFFF
| 565140 ||  || — || November 24, 2014 || Haleakala || Pan-STARRS || L5 || align=right | 10 km || 
|-id=141 bgcolor=#fefefe
| 565141 ||  || — || January 22, 2002 || Kitt Peak || Spacewatch ||  || align=right data-sort-value="0.55" | 550 m || 
|-id=142 bgcolor=#fefefe
| 565142 ||  || — || December 25, 2005 || Kitt Peak || Spacewatch ||  || align=right data-sort-value="0.74" | 740 m || 
|-id=143 bgcolor=#C2FFFF
| 565143 ||  || — || December 20, 2004 || Mount Lemmon || Mount Lemmon Survey || L5 || align=right | 11 km || 
|-id=144 bgcolor=#fefefe
| 565144 ||  || — || April 23, 2007 || Kitt Peak || Spacewatch ||  || align=right data-sort-value="0.59" | 590 m || 
|-id=145 bgcolor=#fefefe
| 565145 ||  || — || August 21, 2015 || Haleakala || Pan-STARRS ||  || align=right data-sort-value="0.82" | 820 m || 
|-id=146 bgcolor=#fefefe
| 565146 ||  || — || March 24, 2014 || Haleakala || Pan-STARRS ||  || align=right data-sort-value="0.64" | 640 m || 
|-id=147 bgcolor=#C2FFFF
| 565147 ||  || — || October 2, 2014 || Haleakala || Pan-STARRS || L5 || align=right | 7.7 km || 
|-id=148 bgcolor=#fefefe
| 565148 ||  || — || January 6, 2010 || Kitt Peak || Spacewatch ||  || align=right data-sort-value="0.59" | 590 m || 
|-id=149 bgcolor=#fefefe
| 565149 ||  || — || March 24, 2014 || Haleakala || Pan-STARRS ||  || align=right data-sort-value="0.58" | 580 m || 
|-id=150 bgcolor=#fefefe
| 565150 ||  || — || September 18, 2012 || Kitt Peak || Spacewatch ||  || align=right data-sort-value="0.57" | 570 m || 
|-id=151 bgcolor=#fefefe
| 565151 ||  || — || January 4, 2013 || Kitt Peak || Spacewatch ||  || align=right data-sort-value="0.83" | 830 m || 
|-id=152 bgcolor=#fefefe
| 565152 ||  || — || March 25, 2003 || Palomar || NEAT || V || align=right data-sort-value="0.69" | 690 m || 
|-id=153 bgcolor=#E9E9E9
| 565153 ||  || — || December 19, 2007 || Kitt Peak || Spacewatch ||  || align=right | 2.1 km || 
|-id=154 bgcolor=#E9E9E9
| 565154 ||  || — || October 4, 2003 || Kitt Peak || Spacewatch ||  || align=right | 1.2 km || 
|-id=155 bgcolor=#fefefe
| 565155 ||  || — || August 30, 2005 || Kitt Peak || Spacewatch ||  || align=right data-sort-value="0.54" | 540 m || 
|-id=156 bgcolor=#E9E9E9
| 565156 ||  || — || November 3, 2011 || Mount Lemmon || Mount Lemmon Survey ||  || align=right | 1.1 km || 
|-id=157 bgcolor=#fefefe
| 565157 ||  || — || September 29, 2008 || Mount Lemmon || Mount Lemmon Survey ||  || align=right data-sort-value="0.76" | 760 m || 
|-id=158 bgcolor=#fefefe
| 565158 ||  || — || February 11, 2014 || Mount Lemmon || Mount Lemmon Survey ||  || align=right data-sort-value="0.69" | 690 m || 
|-id=159 bgcolor=#fefefe
| 565159 ||  || — || January 4, 2017 || Haleakala || Pan-STARRS ||  || align=right data-sort-value="0.72" | 720 m || 
|-id=160 bgcolor=#E9E9E9
| 565160 ||  || — || October 8, 2007 || Catalina || CSS ||  || align=right | 1.7 km || 
|-id=161 bgcolor=#E9E9E9
| 565161 ||  || — || November 15, 2007 || Mount Lemmon || Mount Lemmon Survey ||  || align=right | 1.3 km || 
|-id=162 bgcolor=#E9E9E9
| 565162 ||  || — || March 19, 2001 || Apache Point || SDSS Collaboration ||  || align=right data-sort-value="0.67" | 670 m || 
|-id=163 bgcolor=#fefefe
| 565163 ||  || — || October 29, 2008 || Catalina || CSS ||  || align=right data-sort-value="0.81" | 810 m || 
|-id=164 bgcolor=#E9E9E9
| 565164 ||  || — || December 7, 2016 || Mount Lemmon || Mount Lemmon Survey ||  || align=right | 1.2 km || 
|-id=165 bgcolor=#fefefe
| 565165 ||  || — || November 29, 2005 || Mount Lemmon || Mount Lemmon Survey ||  || align=right data-sort-value="0.72" | 720 m || 
|-id=166 bgcolor=#E9E9E9
| 565166 ||  || — || February 16, 2004 || Kitt Peak || Spacewatch ||  || align=right | 1.8 km || 
|-id=167 bgcolor=#fefefe
| 565167 ||  || — || January 16, 2013 || Haleakala || Pan-STARRS ||  || align=right data-sort-value="0.64" | 640 m || 
|-id=168 bgcolor=#fefefe
| 565168 ||  || — || October 1, 2005 || Mount Lemmon || Mount Lemmon Survey ||  || align=right data-sort-value="0.64" | 640 m || 
|-id=169 bgcolor=#fefefe
| 565169 ||  || — || December 10, 2012 || Mount Lemmon || Mount Lemmon Survey ||  || align=right data-sort-value="0.94" | 940 m || 
|-id=170 bgcolor=#fefefe
| 565170 ||  || — || October 8, 2012 || Haleakala || Pan-STARRS ||  || align=right data-sort-value="0.67" | 670 m || 
|-id=171 bgcolor=#fefefe
| 565171 ||  || — || August 28, 2005 || Kitt Peak || Spacewatch ||  || align=right data-sort-value="0.64" | 640 m || 
|-id=172 bgcolor=#d6d6d6
| 565172 ||  || — || February 25, 2012 || Kitt Peak || Spacewatch ||  || align=right | 2.0 km || 
|-id=173 bgcolor=#fefefe
| 565173 ||  || — || October 17, 2012 || Mount Lemmon || Mount Lemmon Survey ||  || align=right data-sort-value="0.77" | 770 m || 
|-id=174 bgcolor=#fefefe
| 565174 ||  || — || October 29, 2008 || Kitt Peak || Spacewatch ||  || align=right data-sort-value="0.74" | 740 m || 
|-id=175 bgcolor=#fefefe
| 565175 ||  || — || April 9, 2010 || Kitt Peak || Spacewatch ||  || align=right data-sort-value="0.82" | 820 m || 
|-id=176 bgcolor=#fefefe
| 565176 ||  || — || November 20, 2008 || Mount Lemmon || Mount Lemmon Survey ||  || align=right data-sort-value="0.75" | 750 m || 
|-id=177 bgcolor=#fefefe
| 565177 ||  || — || October 22, 2012 || Haleakala || Pan-STARRS ||  || align=right data-sort-value="0.67" | 670 m || 
|-id=178 bgcolor=#fefefe
| 565178 ||  || — || March 19, 2007 || Mount Lemmon || Mount Lemmon Survey ||  || align=right data-sort-value="0.62" | 620 m || 
|-id=179 bgcolor=#fefefe
| 565179 ||  || — || April 20, 2010 || Kitt Peak || Spacewatch ||  || align=right data-sort-value="0.74" | 740 m || 
|-id=180 bgcolor=#fefefe
| 565180 ||  || — || October 15, 2012 || Haleakala || Pan-STARRS ||  || align=right data-sort-value="0.49" | 490 m || 
|-id=181 bgcolor=#fefefe
| 565181 ||  || — || February 17, 2010 || Kitt Peak || Spacewatch ||  || align=right data-sort-value="0.60" | 600 m || 
|-id=182 bgcolor=#fefefe
| 565182 ||  || — || December 29, 2005 || Kitt Peak || Spacewatch ||  || align=right data-sort-value="0.68" | 680 m || 
|-id=183 bgcolor=#fefefe
| 565183 ||  || — || September 15, 2012 || Catalina || CSS ||  || align=right data-sort-value="0.67" | 670 m || 
|-id=184 bgcolor=#d6d6d6
| 565184 ||  || — || February 22, 2012 || Mount Graham || R. P. Boyle, V. Laugalys ||  || align=right | 3.1 km || 
|-id=185 bgcolor=#fefefe
| 565185 ||  || — || October 22, 2005 || Kitt Peak || Spacewatch ||  || align=right data-sort-value="0.67" | 670 m || 
|-id=186 bgcolor=#fefefe
| 565186 ||  || — || November 7, 2012 || Haleakala || Pan-STARRS ||  || align=right data-sort-value="0.77" | 770 m || 
|-id=187 bgcolor=#fefefe
| 565187 ||  || — || March 23, 2006 || Kitt Peak || Spacewatch || NYS || align=right data-sort-value="0.55" | 550 m || 
|-id=188 bgcolor=#E9E9E9
| 565188 ||  || — || January 16, 1996 || Kitt Peak || Spacewatch ||  || align=right | 1.4 km || 
|-id=189 bgcolor=#fefefe
| 565189 ||  || — || April 30, 2014 || Haleakala || Pan-STARRS ||  || align=right data-sort-value="0.86" | 860 m || 
|-id=190 bgcolor=#fefefe
| 565190 ||  || — || February 8, 2013 || Haleakala || Pan-STARRS ||  || align=right data-sort-value="0.63" | 630 m || 
|-id=191 bgcolor=#fefefe
| 565191 ||  || — || February 18, 2013 || Kitt Peak || Spacewatch ||  || align=right data-sort-value="0.78" | 780 m || 
|-id=192 bgcolor=#E9E9E9
| 565192 ||  || — || September 14, 2006 || Kitt Peak || Spacewatch ||  || align=right | 1.5 km || 
|-id=193 bgcolor=#E9E9E9
| 565193 ||  || — || February 9, 2008 || Kitt Peak || Spacewatch ||  || align=right | 1.4 km || 
|-id=194 bgcolor=#E9E9E9
| 565194 ||  || — || November 24, 2011 || Haleakala || Pan-STARRS ||  || align=right | 1.2 km || 
|-id=195 bgcolor=#C2FFFF
| 565195 ||  || — || January 27, 2017 || Haleakala || Pan-STARRS || L5 || align=right | 6.8 km || 
|-id=196 bgcolor=#C2FFFF
| 565196 ||  || — || January 29, 2017 || Haleakala || Pan-STARRS || L5 || align=right | 7.9 km || 
|-id=197 bgcolor=#C2FFFF
| 565197 ||  || — || January 28, 2017 || Haleakala || Pan-STARRS || L5 || align=right | 8.2 km || 
|-id=198 bgcolor=#fefefe
| 565198 ||  || — || January 27, 2017 || Haleakala || Pan-STARRS ||  || align=right data-sort-value="0.57" | 570 m || 
|-id=199 bgcolor=#E9E9E9
| 565199 ||  || — || December 14, 2007 || Mount Lemmon || Mount Lemmon Survey ||  || align=right | 1.1 km || 
|-id=200 bgcolor=#fefefe
| 565200 ||  || — || January 26, 2017 || Haleakala || Pan-STARRS ||  || align=right data-sort-value="0.67" | 670 m || 
|}

565201–565300 

|-bgcolor=#E9E9E9
| 565201 ||  || — || October 20, 2012 || Mount Lemmon || Mount Lemmon Survey ||  || align=right data-sort-value="0.96" | 960 m || 
|-id=202 bgcolor=#fefefe
| 565202 ||  || — || November 10, 2009 || Kitt Peak || Spacewatch ||  || align=right data-sort-value="0.68" | 680 m || 
|-id=203 bgcolor=#fefefe
| 565203 ||  || — || October 18, 2012 || Haleakala || Pan-STARRS ||  || align=right data-sort-value="0.65" | 650 m || 
|-id=204 bgcolor=#fefefe
| 565204 ||  || — || November 12, 2012 || Haleakala || Pan-STARRS ||  || align=right data-sort-value="0.81" | 810 m || 
|-id=205 bgcolor=#fefefe
| 565205 ||  || — || October 22, 2012 || Haleakala || Pan-STARRS ||  || align=right data-sort-value="0.75" | 750 m || 
|-id=206 bgcolor=#fefefe
| 565206 ||  || — || May 7, 2014 || Haleakala || Pan-STARRS ||  || align=right data-sort-value="0.64" | 640 m || 
|-id=207 bgcolor=#E9E9E9
| 565207 ||  || — || August 26, 2014 || Haleakala || Pan-STARRS ||  || align=right | 1.0 km || 
|-id=208 bgcolor=#fefefe
| 565208 ||  || — || January 7, 2010 || Kitt Peak || Spacewatch ||  || align=right data-sort-value="0.66" | 660 m || 
|-id=209 bgcolor=#fefefe
| 565209 ||  || — || May 5, 2006 || Kitt Peak || Spacewatch ||  || align=right data-sort-value="0.96" | 960 m || 
|-id=210 bgcolor=#fefefe
| 565210 ||  || — || November 6, 2008 || Kitt Peak || Spacewatch ||  || align=right data-sort-value="0.86" | 860 m || 
|-id=211 bgcolor=#fefefe
| 565211 ||  || — || April 30, 2014 || Haleakala || Pan-STARRS ||  || align=right data-sort-value="0.55" | 550 m || 
|-id=212 bgcolor=#fefefe
| 565212 ||  || — || August 6, 2011 || Haleakala || Pan-STARRS ||  || align=right data-sort-value="0.70" | 700 m || 
|-id=213 bgcolor=#fefefe
| 565213 ||  || — || August 28, 2005 || Kitt Peak || Spacewatch ||  || align=right data-sort-value="0.90" | 900 m || 
|-id=214 bgcolor=#fefefe
| 565214 ||  || — || February 27, 2006 || Kitt Peak || Spacewatch ||  || align=right data-sort-value="0.62" | 620 m || 
|-id=215 bgcolor=#fefefe
| 565215 ||  || — || December 26, 2005 || Kitt Peak || Spacewatch ||  || align=right data-sort-value="0.55" | 550 m || 
|-id=216 bgcolor=#fefefe
| 565216 ||  || — || January 19, 1996 || Kitt Peak || Spacewatch ||  || align=right data-sort-value="0.53" | 530 m || 
|-id=217 bgcolor=#E9E9E9
| 565217 ||  || — || January 16, 2008 || Mount Lemmon || Mount Lemmon Survey ||  || align=right | 1.2 km || 
|-id=218 bgcolor=#fefefe
| 565218 ||  || — || July 28, 2015 || Haleakala || Pan-STARRS ||  || align=right data-sort-value="0.89" | 890 m || 
|-id=219 bgcolor=#fefefe
| 565219 ||  || — || January 20, 2013 || Kitt Peak || Spacewatch ||  || align=right data-sort-value="0.71" | 710 m || 
|-id=220 bgcolor=#E9E9E9
| 565220 ||  || — || October 3, 2015 || Mount Lemmon || Mount Lemmon Survey ||  || align=right | 1.3 km || 
|-id=221 bgcolor=#E9E9E9
| 565221 ||  || — || April 9, 2013 || Haleakala || Pan-STARRS ||  || align=right | 1.3 km || 
|-id=222 bgcolor=#fefefe
| 565222 ||  || — || March 25, 2014 || Kitt Peak || Spacewatch ||  || align=right data-sort-value="0.76" | 760 m || 
|-id=223 bgcolor=#fefefe
| 565223 ||  || — || November 21, 2008 || Kitt Peak || Spacewatch ||  || align=right data-sort-value="0.89" | 890 m || 
|-id=224 bgcolor=#fefefe
| 565224 ||  || — || December 6, 2005 || Kitt Peak || Spacewatch ||  || align=right data-sort-value="0.83" | 830 m || 
|-id=225 bgcolor=#fefefe
| 565225 ||  || — || September 20, 2011 || Haleakala || Pan-STARRS ||  || align=right data-sort-value="0.66" | 660 m || 
|-id=226 bgcolor=#fefefe
| 565226 ||  || — || February 17, 2010 || Mount Lemmon || Mount Lemmon Survey ||  || align=right data-sort-value="0.47" | 470 m || 
|-id=227 bgcolor=#fefefe
| 565227 ||  || — || September 20, 1995 || Kitt Peak || Spacewatch ||  || align=right data-sort-value="0.59" | 590 m || 
|-id=228 bgcolor=#d6d6d6
| 565228 ||  || — || February 15, 2012 || Haleakala || Pan-STARRS ||  || align=right | 2.9 km || 
|-id=229 bgcolor=#fefefe
| 565229 ||  || — || November 17, 1995 || Kitt Peak || Spacewatch ||  || align=right data-sort-value="0.53" | 530 m || 
|-id=230 bgcolor=#fefefe
| 565230 ||  || — || January 30, 2006 || Kitt Peak || Spacewatch ||  || align=right data-sort-value="0.52" | 520 m || 
|-id=231 bgcolor=#fefefe
| 565231 ||  || — || January 30, 2006 || Kitt Peak || Spacewatch ||  || align=right data-sort-value="0.59" | 590 m || 
|-id=232 bgcolor=#fefefe
| 565232 ||  || — || November 22, 2012 || Catalina || CSS ||  || align=right data-sort-value="0.78" | 780 m || 
|-id=233 bgcolor=#fefefe
| 565233 ||  || — || January 31, 2006 || Kitt Peak || Spacewatch ||  || align=right data-sort-value="0.70" | 700 m || 
|-id=234 bgcolor=#fefefe
| 565234 ||  || — || February 26, 2014 || Haleakala || Pan-STARRS ||  || align=right data-sort-value="0.83" | 830 m || 
|-id=235 bgcolor=#fefefe
| 565235 ||  || — || June 12, 2011 || Mount Lemmon || Mount Lemmon Survey ||  || align=right data-sort-value="0.65" | 650 m || 
|-id=236 bgcolor=#fefefe
| 565236 ||  || — || April 23, 2014 || Cerro Tololo-DECam || CTIO-DECam ||  || align=right data-sort-value="0.51" | 510 m || 
|-id=237 bgcolor=#fefefe
| 565237 ||  || — || March 23, 2003 || Apache Point || SDSS Collaboration ||  || align=right data-sort-value="0.94" | 940 m || 
|-id=238 bgcolor=#fefefe
| 565238 ||  || — || May 9, 2014 || Mount Lemmon || Mount Lemmon Survey ||  || align=right data-sort-value="0.57" | 570 m || 
|-id=239 bgcolor=#fefefe
| 565239 ||  || — || March 23, 2003 || Kitt Peak || Spacewatch ||  || align=right data-sort-value="0.68" | 680 m || 
|-id=240 bgcolor=#fefefe
| 565240 ||  || — || January 11, 2010 || Kitt Peak || Spacewatch ||  || align=right data-sort-value="0.67" | 670 m || 
|-id=241 bgcolor=#fefefe
| 565241 ||  || — || April 5, 2014 || Haleakala || Pan-STARRS ||  || align=right data-sort-value="0.63" | 630 m || 
|-id=242 bgcolor=#fefefe
| 565242 ||  || — || October 17, 2012 || Haleakala || Pan-STARRS ||  || align=right data-sort-value="0.54" | 540 m || 
|-id=243 bgcolor=#fefefe
| 565243 ||  || — || February 22, 2009 || Catalina || CSS || H || align=right data-sort-value="0.74" | 740 m || 
|-id=244 bgcolor=#FA8072
| 565244 ||  || — || January 17, 2004 || Palomar || NEAT ||  || align=right | 1.8 km || 
|-id=245 bgcolor=#fefefe
| 565245 ||  || — || November 21, 2005 || Kitt Peak || Spacewatch ||  || align=right data-sort-value="0.68" | 680 m || 
|-id=246 bgcolor=#fefefe
| 565246 ||  || — || September 11, 2015 || Haleakala || Pan-STARRS ||  || align=right data-sort-value="0.81" | 810 m || 
|-id=247 bgcolor=#E9E9E9
| 565247 ||  || — || April 8, 2013 || Kitt Peak || Spacewatch ||  || align=right | 1.4 km || 
|-id=248 bgcolor=#E9E9E9
| 565248 ||  || — || February 15, 2004 || Palomar || NEAT ||  || align=right | 1.2 km || 
|-id=249 bgcolor=#E9E9E9
| 565249 ||  || — || January 22, 2004 || Palomar || NEAT ||  || align=right | 1.2 km || 
|-id=250 bgcolor=#E9E9E9
| 565250 ||  || — || November 22, 2015 || Mount Lemmon || Mount Lemmon Survey ||  || align=right | 1.1 km || 
|-id=251 bgcolor=#E9E9E9
| 565251 ||  || — || December 18, 2007 || Bergisch Gladbach || W. Bickel ||  || align=right | 1.3 km || 
|-id=252 bgcolor=#fefefe
| 565252 ||  || — || February 10, 2017 || Haleakala || Pan-STARRS ||  || align=right | 1.1 km || 
|-id=253 bgcolor=#E9E9E9
| 565253 ||  || — || February 4, 2017 || Haleakala || Pan-STARRS ||  || align=right | 1.2 km || 
|-id=254 bgcolor=#E9E9E9
| 565254 ||  || — || February 5, 2013 || Kitt Peak || Spacewatch ||  || align=right | 1.1 km || 
|-id=255 bgcolor=#fefefe
| 565255 ||  || — || March 12, 2002 || Palomar || NEAT ||  || align=right data-sort-value="0.79" | 790 m || 
|-id=256 bgcolor=#fefefe
| 565256 ||  || — || April 2, 2006 || Kitt Peak || Spacewatch ||  || align=right data-sort-value="0.64" | 640 m || 
|-id=257 bgcolor=#fefefe
| 565257 ||  || — || October 13, 2005 || Kitt Peak || Spacewatch ||  || align=right data-sort-value="0.54" | 540 m || 
|-id=258 bgcolor=#FA8072
| 565258 ||  || — || December 30, 2005 || Kitt Peak || Spacewatch ||  || align=right | 1.1 km || 
|-id=259 bgcolor=#fefefe
| 565259 ||  || — || November 18, 2008 || Kitt Peak || Spacewatch ||  || align=right data-sort-value="0.49" | 490 m || 
|-id=260 bgcolor=#fefefe
| 565260 ||  || — || April 6, 2010 || Kitt Peak || Spacewatch ||  || align=right data-sort-value="0.98" | 980 m || 
|-id=261 bgcolor=#fefefe
| 565261 ||  || — || November 8, 2008 || Kitt Peak || Spacewatch ||  || align=right data-sort-value="0.63" | 630 m || 
|-id=262 bgcolor=#fefefe
| 565262 ||  || — || August 29, 2005 || Kitt Peak || Spacewatch ||  || align=right data-sort-value="0.69" | 690 m || 
|-id=263 bgcolor=#fefefe
| 565263 ||  || — || September 24, 2008 || Kitt Peak || Spacewatch ||  || align=right data-sort-value="0.58" | 580 m || 
|-id=264 bgcolor=#fefefe
| 565264 ||  || — || March 2, 2006 || Kitt Peak || Spacewatch ||  || align=right data-sort-value="0.58" | 580 m || 
|-id=265 bgcolor=#fefefe
| 565265 ||  || — || March 2, 2006 || Kitt Peak || Spacewatch ||  || align=right data-sort-value="0.85" | 850 m || 
|-id=266 bgcolor=#fefefe
| 565266 ||  || — || April 30, 2014 || Haleakala || Pan-STARRS ||  || align=right data-sort-value="0.79" | 790 m || 
|-id=267 bgcolor=#fefefe
| 565267 ||  || — || March 11, 2007 || Kitt Peak || Spacewatch ||  || align=right data-sort-value="0.70" | 700 m || 
|-id=268 bgcolor=#fefefe
| 565268 ||  || — || March 13, 2010 || Kitt Peak || Spacewatch ||  || align=right data-sort-value="0.48" | 480 m || 
|-id=269 bgcolor=#fefefe
| 565269 ||  || — || January 8, 2010 || Kitt Peak || Spacewatch ||  || align=right data-sort-value="0.62" | 620 m || 
|-id=270 bgcolor=#C2FFFF
| 565270 ||  || — || September 14, 2013 || Haleakala || Pan-STARRS || L5 || align=right | 10 km || 
|-id=271 bgcolor=#fefefe
| 565271 ||  || — || November 2, 2008 || Mount Lemmon || Mount Lemmon Survey ||  || align=right data-sort-value="0.81" | 810 m || 
|-id=272 bgcolor=#fefefe
| 565272 ||  || — || November 21, 2008 || Kitt Peak || Spacewatch ||  || align=right data-sort-value="0.89" | 890 m || 
|-id=273 bgcolor=#fefefe
| 565273 ||  || — || August 7, 2008 || Kitt Peak || Spacewatch ||  || align=right | 1.1 km || 
|-id=274 bgcolor=#E9E9E9
| 565274 ||  || — || March 18, 2004 || Palomar || NEAT ||  || align=right | 2.1 km || 
|-id=275 bgcolor=#E9E9E9
| 565275 ||  || — || December 29, 2008 || Mount Lemmon || Mount Lemmon Survey ||  || align=right data-sort-value="0.86" | 860 m || 
|-id=276 bgcolor=#fefefe
| 565276 ||  || — || January 31, 2006 || Catalina || CSS ||  || align=right data-sort-value="0.76" | 760 m || 
|-id=277 bgcolor=#fefefe
| 565277 ||  || — || October 8, 2004 || Kitt Peak || Spacewatch ||  || align=right data-sort-value="0.93" | 930 m || 
|-id=278 bgcolor=#E9E9E9
| 565278 ||  || — || February 17, 2013 || Mount Lemmon || Mount Lemmon Survey ||  || align=right | 1.7 km || 
|-id=279 bgcolor=#fefefe
| 565279 ||  || — || November 4, 2004 || Kitt Peak || Spacewatch ||  || align=right data-sort-value="0.83" | 830 m || 
|-id=280 bgcolor=#E9E9E9
| 565280 ||  || — || July 25, 2014 || Haleakala || Pan-STARRS ||  || align=right | 1.4 km || 
|-id=281 bgcolor=#fefefe
| 565281 ||  || — || January 1, 1998 || Kitt Peak || Spacewatch ||  || align=right data-sort-value="0.73" | 730 m || 
|-id=282 bgcolor=#fefefe
| 565282 ||  || — || February 1, 2006 || Mount Lemmon || Mount Lemmon Survey ||  || align=right data-sort-value="0.82" | 820 m || 
|-id=283 bgcolor=#fefefe
| 565283 ||  || — || January 22, 2006 || Mount Lemmon || Mount Lemmon Survey ||  || align=right data-sort-value="0.46" | 460 m || 
|-id=284 bgcolor=#fefefe
| 565284 ||  || — || February 1, 2006 || Mount Lemmon || Mount Lemmon Survey ||  || align=right data-sort-value="0.55" | 550 m || 
|-id=285 bgcolor=#fefefe
| 565285 ||  || — || January 7, 2006 || Kitt Peak || Spacewatch ||  || align=right data-sort-value="0.55" | 550 m || 
|-id=286 bgcolor=#fefefe
| 565286 ||  || — || October 18, 2012 || Haleakala || Pan-STARRS ||  || align=right data-sort-value="0.52" | 520 m || 
|-id=287 bgcolor=#fefefe
| 565287 ||  || — || September 24, 2008 || Kitt Peak || Spacewatch ||  || align=right data-sort-value="0.95" | 950 m || 
|-id=288 bgcolor=#fefefe
| 565288 ||  || — || October 7, 2008 || Mount Lemmon || Mount Lemmon Survey ||  || align=right data-sort-value="0.79" | 790 m || 
|-id=289 bgcolor=#E9E9E9
| 565289 ||  || — || February 13, 2013 || ESA OGS || ESA OGS ||  || align=right | 1.0 km || 
|-id=290 bgcolor=#E9E9E9
| 565290 ||  || — || October 24, 2011 || Kitt Peak || Spacewatch ||  || align=right data-sort-value="0.95" | 950 m || 
|-id=291 bgcolor=#fefefe
| 565291 ||  || — || April 4, 2014 || Kitt Peak || Spacewatch ||  || align=right | 1.1 km || 
|-id=292 bgcolor=#E9E9E9
| 565292 ||  || — || January 31, 2017 || Haleakala || Pan-STARRS ||  || align=right | 1.3 km || 
|-id=293 bgcolor=#E9E9E9
| 565293 ||  || — || September 24, 2011 || Haleakala || Pan-STARRS ||  || align=right data-sort-value="0.97" | 970 m || 
|-id=294 bgcolor=#fefefe
| 565294 ||  || — || March 14, 2010 || Mount Lemmon || Mount Lemmon Survey ||  || align=right data-sort-value="0.74" | 740 m || 
|-id=295 bgcolor=#fefefe
| 565295 ||  || — || March 19, 2010 || Mount Lemmon || Mount Lemmon Survey ||  || align=right data-sort-value="0.87" | 870 m || 
|-id=296 bgcolor=#fefefe
| 565296 ||  || — || September 4, 2011 || Haleakala || Pan-STARRS ||  || align=right data-sort-value="0.79" | 790 m || 
|-id=297 bgcolor=#fefefe
| 565297 ||  || — || September 3, 2008 || Kitt Peak || Spacewatch ||  || align=right data-sort-value="0.88" | 880 m || 
|-id=298 bgcolor=#fefefe
| 565298 ||  || — || December 13, 2012 || Mount Lemmon || Mount Lemmon Survey ||  || align=right data-sort-value="0.68" | 680 m || 
|-id=299 bgcolor=#fefefe
| 565299 ||  || — || January 15, 2007 || Kitt Peak || Spacewatch ||  || align=right data-sort-value="0.64" | 640 m || 
|-id=300 bgcolor=#E9E9E9
| 565300 ||  || — || November 18, 2003 || Kitt Peak || Spacewatch ||  || align=right data-sort-value="0.69" | 690 m || 
|}

565301–565400 

|-bgcolor=#fefefe
| 565301 ||  || — || September 23, 2008 || Kitt Peak || Spacewatch ||  || align=right data-sort-value="0.54" | 540 m || 
|-id=302 bgcolor=#fefefe
| 565302 ||  || — || June 9, 2007 || Kitt Peak || Spacewatch ||  || align=right data-sort-value="0.83" | 830 m || 
|-id=303 bgcolor=#fefefe
| 565303 ||  || — || October 19, 2012 || Haleakala || Pan-STARRS ||  || align=right data-sort-value="0.62" | 620 m || 
|-id=304 bgcolor=#fefefe
| 565304 ||  || — || February 1, 2003 || Kitt Peak || Spacewatch ||  || align=right data-sort-value="0.73" | 730 m || 
|-id=305 bgcolor=#fefefe
| 565305 ||  || — || December 6, 2012 || Mount Lemmon || Mount Lemmon Survey ||  || align=right data-sort-value="0.58" | 580 m || 
|-id=306 bgcolor=#fefefe
| 565306 ||  || — || January 3, 2003 || Kitt Peak || Spacewatch ||  || align=right data-sort-value="0.65" | 650 m || 
|-id=307 bgcolor=#fefefe
| 565307 ||  || — || October 18, 2012 || Haleakala || Pan-STARRS ||  || align=right data-sort-value="0.55" | 550 m || 
|-id=308 bgcolor=#fefefe
| 565308 ||  || — || September 8, 1996 || Kitt Peak || Spacewatch ||  || align=right data-sort-value="0.61" | 610 m || 
|-id=309 bgcolor=#fefefe
| 565309 ||  || — || May 28, 2014 || Mount Lemmon || Mount Lemmon Survey ||  || align=right data-sort-value="0.59" | 590 m || 
|-id=310 bgcolor=#fefefe
| 565310 ||  || — || November 7, 2008 || Mount Lemmon || Mount Lemmon Survey ||  || align=right data-sort-value="0.82" | 820 m || 
|-id=311 bgcolor=#fefefe
| 565311 ||  || — || July 28, 2011 || Haleakala || Pan-STARRS ||  || align=right data-sort-value="0.68" | 680 m || 
|-id=312 bgcolor=#fefefe
| 565312 ||  || — || September 12, 2004 || Kitt Peak || Spacewatch ||  || align=right data-sort-value="0.66" | 660 m || 
|-id=313 bgcolor=#fefefe
| 565313 ||  || — || October 26, 2008 || Kitt Peak || Spacewatch ||  || align=right data-sort-value="0.57" | 570 m || 
|-id=314 bgcolor=#fefefe
| 565314 ||  || — || September 23, 2005 || Catalina || CSS ||  || align=right data-sort-value="0.66" | 660 m || 
|-id=315 bgcolor=#fefefe
| 565315 ||  || — || August 9, 2015 || Haleakala || Pan-STARRS ||  || align=right data-sort-value="0.51" | 510 m || 
|-id=316 bgcolor=#fefefe
| 565316 ||  || — || December 29, 2005 || Kitt Peak || Spacewatch ||  || align=right data-sort-value="0.63" | 630 m || 
|-id=317 bgcolor=#fefefe
| 565317 ||  || — || May 24, 2010 || Kitt Peak || Spacewatch ||  || align=right data-sort-value="0.78" | 780 m || 
|-id=318 bgcolor=#fefefe
| 565318 ||  || — || November 24, 2000 || Kitt Peak || Kitt Peak Obs. ||  || align=right data-sort-value="0.83" | 830 m || 
|-id=319 bgcolor=#fefefe
| 565319 ||  || — || February 14, 2010 || Mount Lemmon || Mount Lemmon Survey ||  || align=right data-sort-value="0.60" | 600 m || 
|-id=320 bgcolor=#fefefe
| 565320 ||  || — || January 26, 2006 || Kitt Peak || Spacewatch ||  || align=right data-sort-value="0.62" | 620 m || 
|-id=321 bgcolor=#fefefe
| 565321 ||  || — || April 4, 2014 || Haleakala || Pan-STARRS ||  || align=right data-sort-value="0.87" | 870 m || 
|-id=322 bgcolor=#E9E9E9
| 565322 ||  || — || January 17, 2013 || Mount Lemmon || Mount Lemmon Survey ||  || align=right data-sort-value="0.81" | 810 m || 
|-id=323 bgcolor=#fefefe
| 565323 ||  || — || November 19, 2008 || Mount Lemmon || Mount Lemmon Survey ||  || align=right data-sort-value="0.66" | 660 m || 
|-id=324 bgcolor=#fefefe
| 565324 ||  || — || August 30, 2011 || Haleakala || Pan-STARRS ||  || align=right data-sort-value="0.85" | 850 m || 
|-id=325 bgcolor=#fefefe
| 565325 ||  || — || October 25, 2012 || Mount Lemmon || Mount Lemmon Survey ||  || align=right data-sort-value="0.58" | 580 m || 
|-id=326 bgcolor=#fefefe
| 565326 ||  || — || February 20, 2002 || Kitt Peak || Spacewatch ||  || align=right data-sort-value="0.75" | 750 m || 
|-id=327 bgcolor=#fefefe
| 565327 ||  || — || March 25, 2007 || Mount Lemmon || Mount Lemmon Survey ||  || align=right data-sort-value="0.67" | 670 m || 
|-id=328 bgcolor=#E9E9E9
| 565328 ||  || — || October 22, 2003 || Apache Point || SDSS Collaboration ||  || align=right | 1.1 km || 
|-id=329 bgcolor=#E9E9E9
| 565329 ||  || — || September 26, 2003 || Palomar || NEAT ||  || align=right | 1.3 km || 
|-id=330 bgcolor=#fefefe
| 565330 ||  || — || November 18, 2008 || Kitt Peak || Spacewatch ||  || align=right data-sort-value="0.94" | 940 m || 
|-id=331 bgcolor=#fefefe
| 565331 ||  || — || January 10, 2006 || Mount Lemmon || Mount Lemmon Survey ||  || align=right data-sort-value="0.51" | 510 m || 
|-id=332 bgcolor=#fefefe
| 565332 ||  || — || October 20, 2008 || Mount Lemmon || Mount Lemmon Survey ||  || align=right data-sort-value="0.59" | 590 m || 
|-id=333 bgcolor=#fefefe
| 565333 ||  || — || March 15, 2010 || Moletai || Mount Lemmon Survey ||  || align=right data-sort-value="0.81" | 810 m || 
|-id=334 bgcolor=#fefefe
| 565334 ||  || — || November 7, 2012 || Haleakala || Pan-STARRS ||  || align=right data-sort-value="0.60" | 600 m || 
|-id=335 bgcolor=#fefefe
| 565335 ||  || — || October 16, 2007 || Mount Lemmon || Mount Lemmon Survey ||  || align=right data-sort-value="0.89" | 890 m || 
|-id=336 bgcolor=#fefefe
| 565336 ||  || — || October 27, 2008 || Mount Lemmon || Mount Lemmon Survey ||  || align=right data-sort-value="0.76" | 760 m || 
|-id=337 bgcolor=#fefefe
| 565337 ||  || — || February 10, 2010 || Kitt Peak || Spacewatch ||  || align=right data-sort-value="0.54" | 540 m || 
|-id=338 bgcolor=#fefefe
| 565338 ||  || — || September 26, 2011 || Haleakala || Pan-STARRS ||  || align=right data-sort-value="0.73" | 730 m || 
|-id=339 bgcolor=#fefefe
| 565339 ||  || — || September 19, 2007 || Kitt Peak || Spacewatch ||  || align=right data-sort-value="0.89" | 890 m || 
|-id=340 bgcolor=#fefefe
| 565340 ||  || — || May 23, 2014 || Haleakala || Pan-STARRS ||  || align=right data-sort-value="0.55" | 550 m || 
|-id=341 bgcolor=#fefefe
| 565341 ||  || — || October 20, 2008 || Mount Lemmon || Mount Lemmon Survey ||  || align=right data-sort-value="0.58" | 580 m || 
|-id=342 bgcolor=#E9E9E9
| 565342 ||  || — || October 29, 2003 || Kitt Peak || Spacewatch ||  || align=right | 1.1 km || 
|-id=343 bgcolor=#fefefe
| 565343 ||  || — || October 20, 2008 || Kitt Peak || Spacewatch ||  || align=right data-sort-value="0.83" | 830 m || 
|-id=344 bgcolor=#fefefe
| 565344 ||  || — || December 31, 2008 || Mount Lemmon || Mount Lemmon Survey ||  || align=right data-sort-value="0.91" | 910 m || 
|-id=345 bgcolor=#fefefe
| 565345 ||  || — || November 20, 2000 || Kitt Peak || Spacewatch ||  || align=right data-sort-value="0.75" | 750 m || 
|-id=346 bgcolor=#fefefe
| 565346 ||  || — || February 16, 2010 || Mount Lemmon || Mount Lemmon Survey ||  || align=right data-sort-value="0.70" | 700 m || 
|-id=347 bgcolor=#fefefe
| 565347 ||  || — || December 11, 2012 || Mount Lemmon || Mount Lemmon Survey ||  || align=right data-sort-value="0.73" | 730 m || 
|-id=348 bgcolor=#E9E9E9
| 565348 ||  || — || March 8, 2013 || Haleakala || Pan-STARRS ||  || align=right data-sort-value="0.90" | 900 m || 
|-id=349 bgcolor=#E9E9E9
| 565349 ||  || — || December 22, 2012 || Haleakala || Pan-STARRS ||  || align=right | 1.5 km || 
|-id=350 bgcolor=#fefefe
| 565350 ||  || — || April 7, 2003 || Kitt Peak || Spacewatch ||  || align=right data-sort-value="0.81" | 810 m || 
|-id=351 bgcolor=#fefefe
| 565351 ||  || — || March 4, 2006 || Mount Lemmon || Mount Lemmon Survey ||  || align=right data-sort-value="0.71" | 710 m || 
|-id=352 bgcolor=#E9E9E9
| 565352 ||  || — || March 5, 2013 || Haleakala || Pan-STARRS ||  || align=right | 1.8 km || 
|-id=353 bgcolor=#fefefe
| 565353 ||  || — || February 21, 2017 || Mount Lemmon || Mount Lemmon Survey ||  || align=right data-sort-value="0.59" | 590 m || 
|-id=354 bgcolor=#fefefe
| 565354 ||  || — || June 23, 2014 || Mount Lemmon || Mount Lemmon Survey ||  || align=right data-sort-value="0.71" | 710 m || 
|-id=355 bgcolor=#C2FFFF
| 565355 ||  || — || November 22, 2014 || Haleakala || Pan-STARRS || L5 || align=right | 8.7 km || 
|-id=356 bgcolor=#fefefe
| 565356 ||  || — || January 9, 2006 || Kitt Peak || Spacewatch ||  || align=right data-sort-value="0.75" | 750 m || 
|-id=357 bgcolor=#fefefe
| 565357 ||  || — || March 29, 2003 || Kitt Peak || Spacewatch ||  || align=right data-sort-value="0.78" | 780 m || 
|-id=358 bgcolor=#fefefe
| 565358 ||  || — || February 16, 2002 || Palomar || NEAT ||  || align=right data-sort-value="0.80" | 800 m || 
|-id=359 bgcolor=#fefefe
| 565359 ||  || — || March 22, 2006 || Catalina || CSS ||  || align=right data-sort-value="0.78" | 780 m || 
|-id=360 bgcolor=#fefefe
| 565360 ||  || — || April 26, 2007 || Kitt Peak || Spacewatch ||  || align=right data-sort-value="0.64" | 640 m || 
|-id=361 bgcolor=#fefefe
| 565361 ||  || — || November 20, 2008 || Mount Lemmon || Mount Lemmon Survey ||  || align=right data-sort-value="0.93" | 930 m || 
|-id=362 bgcolor=#fefefe
| 565362 ||  || — || February 21, 2017 || Mount Lemmon || Mount Lemmon Survey ||  || align=right data-sort-value="0.56" | 560 m || 
|-id=363 bgcolor=#fefefe
| 565363 ||  || — || December 21, 2008 || Mount Lemmon || Mount Lemmon Survey ||  || align=right data-sort-value="0.85" | 850 m || 
|-id=364 bgcolor=#E9E9E9
| 565364 ||  || — || March 6, 2013 || Haleakala || Pan-STARRS ||  || align=right | 1.1 km || 
|-id=365 bgcolor=#E9E9E9
| 565365 ||  || — || May 15, 2001 || Kitt Peak || Spacewatch ||  || align=right data-sort-value="0.98" | 980 m || 
|-id=366 bgcolor=#fefefe
| 565366 ||  || — || February 2, 2006 || Mount Lemmon || Mount Lemmon Survey ||  || align=right data-sort-value="0.62" | 620 m || 
|-id=367 bgcolor=#fefefe
| 565367 ||  || — || January 23, 2006 || Kitt Peak || Spacewatch ||  || align=right data-sort-value="0.53" | 530 m || 
|-id=368 bgcolor=#E9E9E9
| 565368 ||  || — || February 1, 2009 || Kitt Peak || Spacewatch ||  || align=right | 1.6 km || 
|-id=369 bgcolor=#E9E9E9
| 565369 ||  || — || January 22, 2013 || Mount Lemmon || Mount Lemmon Survey ||  || align=right data-sort-value="0.96" | 960 m || 
|-id=370 bgcolor=#fefefe
| 565370 ||  || — || January 5, 2013 || Mount Lemmon || Mount Lemmon Survey ||  || align=right data-sort-value="0.74" | 740 m || 
|-id=371 bgcolor=#E9E9E9
| 565371 ||  || — || June 29, 2014 || Haleakala || Pan-STARRS ||  || align=right | 1.3 km || 
|-id=372 bgcolor=#fefefe
| 565372 ||  || — || May 19, 2014 || Haleakala || Pan-STARRS ||  || align=right data-sort-value="0.83" | 830 m || 
|-id=373 bgcolor=#fefefe
| 565373 ||  || — || December 14, 2001 || Socorro || LINEAR ||  || align=right data-sort-value="0.62" | 620 m || 
|-id=374 bgcolor=#fefefe
| 565374 ||  || — || October 18, 2003 || Apache Point || SDSS Collaboration ||  || align=right data-sort-value="0.88" | 880 m || 
|-id=375 bgcolor=#fefefe
| 565375 ||  || — || February 8, 2007 || Mount Lemmon || Mount Lemmon Survey ||  || align=right data-sort-value="0.62" | 620 m || 
|-id=376 bgcolor=#fefefe
| 565376 ||  || — || January 31, 2006 || Mount Lemmon || Mount Lemmon Survey ||  || align=right data-sort-value="0.65" | 650 m || 
|-id=377 bgcolor=#E9E9E9
| 565377 ||  || — || June 24, 2014 || Kitt Peak || Pan-STARRS ||  || align=right | 1.8 km || 
|-id=378 bgcolor=#fefefe
| 565378 ||  || — || May 24, 2014 || Mount Lemmon || Mount Lemmon Survey ||  || align=right data-sort-value="0.67" | 670 m || 
|-id=379 bgcolor=#E9E9E9
| 565379 ||  || — || December 23, 2012 || Haleakala || Pan-STARRS ||  || align=right | 1.5 km || 
|-id=380 bgcolor=#fefefe
| 565380 ||  || — || January 21, 2002 || Kitt Peak || Spacewatch ||  || align=right data-sort-value="0.54" | 540 m || 
|-id=381 bgcolor=#fefefe
| 565381 ||  || — || February 25, 2006 || Kitt Peak || Spacewatch ||  || align=right data-sort-value="0.56" | 560 m || 
|-id=382 bgcolor=#E9E9E9
| 565382 ||  || — || February 22, 2004 || Kitt Peak || M. W. Buie ||  || align=right | 2.0 km || 
|-id=383 bgcolor=#fefefe
| 565383 ||  || — || January 23, 2013 || Mount Lemmon || Mount Lemmon Survey ||  || align=right data-sort-value="0.65" | 650 m || 
|-id=384 bgcolor=#E9E9E9
| 565384 ||  || — || March 18, 2013 || Kitt Peak || Spacewatch ||  || align=right data-sort-value="0.67" | 670 m || 
|-id=385 bgcolor=#fefefe
| 565385 ||  || — || January 19, 2013 || Mount Lemmon || Mount Lemmon Survey ||  || align=right data-sort-value="0.63" | 630 m || 
|-id=386 bgcolor=#E9E9E9
| 565386 ||  || — || September 12, 2005 || Kitt Peak || Spacewatch ||  || align=right | 2.4 km || 
|-id=387 bgcolor=#fefefe
| 565387 ||  || — || February 11, 2002 || Socorro || LINEAR ||  || align=right data-sort-value="0.67" | 670 m || 
|-id=388 bgcolor=#fefefe
| 565388 ||  || — || January 4, 2013 || Kitt Peak || Spacewatch ||  || align=right data-sort-value="0.64" | 640 m || 
|-id=389 bgcolor=#fefefe
| 565389 ||  || — || March 12, 2003 || Kitt Peak || Spacewatch ||  || align=right data-sort-value="0.79" | 790 m || 
|-id=390 bgcolor=#fefefe
| 565390 ||  || — || April 21, 2006 || Catalina || CSS ||  || align=right data-sort-value="0.69" | 690 m || 
|-id=391 bgcolor=#fefefe
| 565391 ||  || — || March 4, 2013 || Haleakala || Pan-STARRS ||  || align=right data-sort-value="0.87" | 870 m || 
|-id=392 bgcolor=#fefefe
| 565392 ||  || — || February 25, 2006 || Kitt Peak || Spacewatch ||  || align=right data-sort-value="0.59" | 590 m || 
|-id=393 bgcolor=#E9E9E9
| 565393 ||  || — || February 10, 2008 || Kitt Peak || Mount Lemmon Survey ||  || align=right | 1.4 km || 
|-id=394 bgcolor=#E9E9E9
| 565394 ||  || — || March 19, 2013 || Haleakala || Pan-STARRS ||  || align=right data-sort-value="0.77" | 770 m || 
|-id=395 bgcolor=#E9E9E9
| 565395 ||  || — || November 24, 2011 || Mount Lemmon || Mount Lemmon Survey ||  || align=right | 1.0 km || 
|-id=396 bgcolor=#E9E9E9
| 565396 ||  || — || November 13, 2015 || Kitt Peak || Spacewatch ||  || align=right data-sort-value="0.91" | 910 m || 
|-id=397 bgcolor=#E9E9E9
| 565397 ||  || — || April 3, 2013 || Mount Lemmon || Mount Lemmon Survey ||  || align=right data-sort-value="0.75" | 750 m || 
|-id=398 bgcolor=#E9E9E9
| 565398 ||  || — || November 8, 2007 || Kitt Peak || Spacewatch ||  || align=right data-sort-value="0.77" | 770 m || 
|-id=399 bgcolor=#E9E9E9
| 565399 ||  || — || April 1, 2013 || Mount Lemmon || Mount Lemmon Survey ||  || align=right | 1.3 km || 
|-id=400 bgcolor=#E9E9E9
| 565400 ||  || — || February 21, 2017 || Haleakala || Pan-STARRS ||  || align=right | 1.2 km || 
|}

565401–565500 

|-bgcolor=#E9E9E9
| 565401 ||  || — || May 27, 2000 || Socorro || LINEAR ||  || align=right | 1.6 km || 
|-id=402 bgcolor=#fefefe
| 565402 ||  || — || October 23, 2008 || Palomar || Spacewatch ||  || align=right data-sort-value="0.96" | 960 m || 
|-id=403 bgcolor=#E9E9E9
| 565403 ||  || — || September 19, 2003 || Kitt Peak || Spacewatch ||  || align=right data-sort-value="0.80" | 800 m || 
|-id=404 bgcolor=#fefefe
| 565404 ||  || — || November 26, 2005 || Kitt Peak || Spacewatch ||  || align=right data-sort-value="0.68" | 680 m || 
|-id=405 bgcolor=#E9E9E9
| 565405 ||  || — || July 25, 2015 || Haleakala || Pan-STARRS ||  || align=right data-sort-value="0.83" | 830 m || 
|-id=406 bgcolor=#E9E9E9
| 565406 ||  || — || February 13, 2004 || Anderson Mesa || LONEOS ||  || align=right | 2.0 km || 
|-id=407 bgcolor=#fefefe
| 565407 ||  || — || January 26, 2006 || Kitt Peak || Spacewatch ||  || align=right data-sort-value="0.67" | 670 m || 
|-id=408 bgcolor=#E9E9E9
| 565408 ||  || — || October 21, 2011 || Mount Lemmon || Mount Lemmon Survey ||  || align=right | 1.4 km || 
|-id=409 bgcolor=#fefefe
| 565409 ||  || — || April 7, 2010 || Mount Lemmon || Mount Lemmon Survey ||  || align=right data-sort-value="0.83" | 830 m || 
|-id=410 bgcolor=#fefefe
| 565410 ||  || — || May 5, 2014 || Kitt Peak || Spacewatch ||  || align=right data-sort-value="0.94" | 940 m || 
|-id=411 bgcolor=#E9E9E9
| 565411 ||  || — || February 13, 2004 || Kitt Peak || Spacewatch ||  || align=right | 1.4 km || 
|-id=412 bgcolor=#fefefe
| 565412 ||  || — || February 7, 2002 || Kitt Peak || Spacewatch ||  || align=right data-sort-value="0.62" | 620 m || 
|-id=413 bgcolor=#E9E9E9
| 565413 ||  || — || February 11, 2013 || Nogales || M. Schwartz, P. R. Holvorcem ||  || align=right | 1.3 km || 
|-id=414 bgcolor=#fefefe
| 565414 ||  || — || May 9, 2006 || Mount Lemmon || Mount Lemmon Survey ||  || align=right data-sort-value="0.79" | 790 m || 
|-id=415 bgcolor=#E9E9E9
| 565415 ||  || — || February 13, 2013 || ESA OGS || ESA OGS ||  || align=right data-sort-value="0.75" | 750 m || 
|-id=416 bgcolor=#fefefe
| 565416 ||  || — || August 27, 2000 || Cerro Tololo || R. Millis, L. H. Wasserman ||  || align=right data-sort-value="0.62" | 620 m || 
|-id=417 bgcolor=#E9E9E9
| 565417 ||  || — || November 23, 2003 || Kitt Peak || Spacewatch ||  || align=right | 1.4 km || 
|-id=418 bgcolor=#fefefe
| 565418 ||  || — || January 7, 2017 || Mount Lemmon || Mount Lemmon Survey ||  || align=right data-sort-value="0.78" | 780 m || 
|-id=419 bgcolor=#fefefe
| 565419 ||  || — || April 7, 2006 || Kitt Peak || Spacewatch ||  || align=right data-sort-value="0.92" | 920 m || 
|-id=420 bgcolor=#fefefe
| 565420 ||  || — || October 19, 2015 || Haleakala || Pan-STARRS ||  || align=right data-sort-value="0.79" | 790 m || 
|-id=421 bgcolor=#E9E9E9
| 565421 ||  || — || September 22, 2003 || Kitt Peak || Spacewatch ||  || align=right data-sort-value="0.87" | 870 m || 
|-id=422 bgcolor=#E9E9E9
| 565422 ||  || — || January 20, 1996 || Kitt Peak || Spacewatch ||  || align=right | 1.2 km || 
|-id=423 bgcolor=#E9E9E9
| 565423 ||  || — || December 30, 2008 || Mount Lemmon || Mount Lemmon Survey ||  || align=right | 1.2 km || 
|-id=424 bgcolor=#fefefe
| 565424 ||  || — || February 22, 2006 || Catalina || CSS ||  || align=right data-sort-value="0.72" | 720 m || 
|-id=425 bgcolor=#fefefe
| 565425 ||  || — || October 10, 2004 || Kitt Peak || Spacewatch ||  || align=right data-sort-value="0.74" | 740 m || 
|-id=426 bgcolor=#E9E9E9
| 565426 ||  || — || February 13, 2004 || Kitt Peak || Spacewatch ||  || align=right | 1.8 km || 
|-id=427 bgcolor=#fefefe
| 565427 ||  || — || February 3, 2013 || Haleakala || Pan-STARRS ||  || align=right data-sort-value="0.79" | 790 m || 
|-id=428 bgcolor=#fefefe
| 565428 ||  || — || January 26, 2006 || Mount Lemmon || Mount Lemmon Survey ||  || align=right data-sort-value="0.70" | 700 m || 
|-id=429 bgcolor=#E9E9E9
| 565429 ||  || — || March 11, 2013 || Mount Lemmon || Mount Lemmon Survey ||  || align=right | 1.4 km || 
|-id=430 bgcolor=#E9E9E9
| 565430 ||  || — || January 2, 2017 || Haleakala || Pan-STARRS ||  || align=right data-sort-value="0.85" | 850 m || 
|-id=431 bgcolor=#fefefe
| 565431 ||  || — || September 21, 2012 || Mount Lemmon || Mount Lemmon Survey ||  || align=right data-sort-value="0.89" | 890 m || 
|-id=432 bgcolor=#fefefe
| 565432 ||  || — || February 1, 2006 || Kitt Peak || Spacewatch ||  || align=right data-sort-value="0.67" | 670 m || 
|-id=433 bgcolor=#fefefe
| 565433 ||  || — || January 17, 2010 || Kitt Peak || Spacewatch ||  || align=right | 1.2 km || 
|-id=434 bgcolor=#E9E9E9
| 565434 ||  || — || December 20, 2004 || Mount Lemmon || Mount Lemmon Survey ||  || align=right | 1.1 km || 
|-id=435 bgcolor=#E9E9E9
| 565435 ||  || — || September 24, 2011 || Haleakala || Pan-STARRS ||  || align=right | 1.0 km || 
|-id=436 bgcolor=#fefefe
| 565436 ||  || — || February 22, 2006 || Kitt Peak || LINEAR ||  || align=right data-sort-value="0.93" | 930 m || 
|-id=437 bgcolor=#E9E9E9
| 565437 ||  || — || April 26, 2004 || Kitt Peak || Spacewatch ||  || align=right | 2.9 km || 
|-id=438 bgcolor=#E9E9E9
| 565438 ||  || — || December 22, 2003 || Socorro || LINEAR ||  || align=right | 1.5 km || 
|-id=439 bgcolor=#d6d6d6
| 565439 ||  || — || December 28, 2005 || Mount Lemmon || Mount Lemmon Survey ||  || align=right | 3.4 km || 
|-id=440 bgcolor=#d6d6d6
| 565440 ||  || — || November 21, 2015 || Mount Lemmon || Mount Lemmon Survey ||  || align=right | 2.0 km || 
|-id=441 bgcolor=#E9E9E9
| 565441 ||  || — || September 12, 2002 || Palomar || NEAT ||  || align=right | 1.6 km || 
|-id=442 bgcolor=#fefefe
| 565442 ||  || — || December 4, 2005 || Kitt Peak || Spacewatch ||  || align=right data-sort-value="0.86" | 860 m || 
|-id=443 bgcolor=#E9E9E9
| 565443 ||  || — || September 18, 2010 || Mount Lemmon || Mount Lemmon Survey ||  || align=right | 1.0 km || 
|-id=444 bgcolor=#E9E9E9
| 565444 ||  || — || March 19, 2013 || Haleakala || Pan-STARRS ||  || align=right data-sort-value="0.75" | 750 m || 
|-id=445 bgcolor=#E9E9E9
| 565445 ||  || — || February 14, 2013 || Haleakala || Pan-STARRS ||  || align=right data-sort-value="0.66" | 660 m || 
|-id=446 bgcolor=#fefefe
| 565446 ||  || — || March 5, 2002 || Apache Point || SDSS Collaboration ||  || align=right data-sort-value="0.87" | 870 m || 
|-id=447 bgcolor=#fefefe
| 565447 ||  || — || March 8, 2006 || Kitt Peak || Spacewatch ||  || align=right data-sort-value="0.71" | 710 m || 
|-id=448 bgcolor=#E9E9E9
| 565448 ||  || — || March 6, 2013 || Haleakala || Pan-STARRS ||  || align=right | 1.2 km || 
|-id=449 bgcolor=#fefefe
| 565449 ||  || — || October 18, 2007 || Kitt Peak || Spacewatch ||  || align=right data-sort-value="0.91" | 910 m || 
|-id=450 bgcolor=#E9E9E9
| 565450 ||  || — || January 26, 2017 || Haleakala || Pan-STARRS ||  || align=right | 1.1 km || 
|-id=451 bgcolor=#fefefe
| 565451 ||  || — || January 26, 2006 || Kitt Peak || Spacewatch ||  || align=right data-sort-value="0.76" | 760 m || 
|-id=452 bgcolor=#E9E9E9
| 565452 ||  || — || October 18, 1998 || Kitt Peak || Spacewatch ||  || align=right | 1.3 km || 
|-id=453 bgcolor=#fefefe
| 565453 ||  || — || February 15, 2013 || Haleakala || Pan-STARRS ||  || align=right data-sort-value="0.76" | 760 m || 
|-id=454 bgcolor=#fefefe
| 565454 ||  || — || August 9, 2007 || Kitt Peak || Spacewatch ||  || align=right data-sort-value="0.89" | 890 m || 
|-id=455 bgcolor=#fefefe
| 565455 ||  || — || September 23, 2008 || Kitt Peak || Spacewatch ||  || align=right data-sort-value="0.76" | 760 m || 
|-id=456 bgcolor=#E9E9E9
| 565456 ||  || — || January 18, 2004 || Palomar || NEAT ||  || align=right | 1.2 km || 
|-id=457 bgcolor=#fefefe
| 565457 ||  || — || June 28, 2014 || Haleakala || Pan-STARRS ||  || align=right data-sort-value="0.75" | 750 m || 
|-id=458 bgcolor=#fefefe
| 565458 ||  || — || January 10, 2006 || Mount Lemmon || Mount Lemmon Survey ||  || align=right data-sort-value="0.82" | 820 m || 
|-id=459 bgcolor=#fefefe
| 565459 ||  || — || November 18, 2008 || Kitt Peak || Spacewatch ||  || align=right data-sort-value="0.67" | 670 m || 
|-id=460 bgcolor=#fefefe
| 565460 ||  || — || November 19, 2008 || Kitt Peak || Spacewatch ||  || align=right data-sort-value="0.71" | 710 m || 
|-id=461 bgcolor=#fefefe
| 565461 ||  || — || July 26, 2011 || Haleakala || Pan-STARRS ||  || align=right data-sort-value="0.78" | 780 m || 
|-id=462 bgcolor=#fefefe
| 565462 ||  || — || July 1, 2014 || Haleakala || Pan-STARRS ||  || align=right data-sort-value="0.60" | 600 m || 
|-id=463 bgcolor=#E9E9E9
| 565463 ||  || — || April 11, 2013 || Kitt Peak || Spacewatch ||  || align=right | 1.2 km || 
|-id=464 bgcolor=#E9E9E9
| 565464 ||  || — || February 29, 2008 || Catalina || CSS ||  || align=right | 3.0 km || 
|-id=465 bgcolor=#E9E9E9
| 565465 ||  || — || January 30, 2017 || Haleakala || Pan-STARRS ||  || align=right | 1.8 km || 
|-id=466 bgcolor=#fefefe
| 565466 ||  || — || September 27, 2008 || Mount Lemmon || Mount Lemmon Survey ||  || align=right data-sort-value="0.74" | 740 m || 
|-id=467 bgcolor=#E9E9E9
| 565467 ||  || — || December 15, 2007 || Catalina || CSS || EUN || align=right | 1.5 km || 
|-id=468 bgcolor=#E9E9E9
| 565468 ||  || — || February 18, 2017 || Haleakala || Pan-STARRS ||  || align=right | 1.2 km || 
|-id=469 bgcolor=#fefefe
| 565469 ||  || — || January 22, 2002 || Kitt Peak || Spacewatch || NYS || align=right data-sort-value="0.71" | 710 m || 
|-id=470 bgcolor=#fefefe
| 565470 ||  || — || October 26, 2005 || Kitt Peak || Spacewatch ||  || align=right data-sort-value="0.64" | 640 m || 
|-id=471 bgcolor=#E9E9E9
| 565471 ||  || — || October 23, 2011 || Mount Lemmon || Mount Lemmon Survey ||  || align=right data-sort-value="0.76" | 760 m || 
|-id=472 bgcolor=#fefefe
| 565472 ||  || — || April 2, 2006 || Kitt Peak || Spacewatch ||  || align=right data-sort-value="0.77" | 770 m || 
|-id=473 bgcolor=#fefefe
| 565473 ||  || — || November 30, 2005 || Kitt Peak || Spacewatch ||  || align=right data-sort-value="0.65" | 650 m || 
|-id=474 bgcolor=#fefefe
| 565474 ||  || — || August 24, 2008 || Kitt Peak || Spacewatch ||  || align=right data-sort-value="0.71" | 710 m || 
|-id=475 bgcolor=#fefefe
| 565475 ||  || — || December 29, 2005 || Mount Lemmon || Mount Lemmon Survey ||  || align=right data-sort-value="0.68" | 680 m || 
|-id=476 bgcolor=#fefefe
| 565476 ||  || — || November 12, 2005 || Kitt Peak || Spacewatch ||  || align=right data-sort-value="0.61" | 610 m || 
|-id=477 bgcolor=#E9E9E9
| 565477 ||  || — || November 20, 2015 || Mount Lemmon || Mount Lemmon Survey ||  || align=right | 1.1 km || 
|-id=478 bgcolor=#fefefe
| 565478 ||  || — || November 4, 2012 || Kitt Peak || Spacewatch ||  || align=right data-sort-value="0.87" | 870 m || 
|-id=479 bgcolor=#E9E9E9
| 565479 ||  || — || May 6, 2005 || Mount Lemmon || Mount Lemmon Survey ||  || align=right data-sort-value="0.84" | 840 m || 
|-id=480 bgcolor=#E9E9E9
| 565480 ||  || — || February 15, 2013 || Haleakala || Pan-STARRS ||  || align=right | 1.2 km || 
|-id=481 bgcolor=#fefefe
| 565481 ||  || — || January 10, 2013 || Haleakala || Pan-STARRS || V || align=right data-sort-value="0.59" | 590 m || 
|-id=482 bgcolor=#fefefe
| 565482 ||  || — || September 29, 2008 || Mount Lemmon || Mount Lemmon Survey ||  || align=right data-sort-value="0.70" | 700 m || 
|-id=483 bgcolor=#fefefe
| 565483 ||  || — || October 8, 2012 || Mount Lemmon || Mount Lemmon Survey ||  || align=right data-sort-value="0.71" | 710 m || 
|-id=484 bgcolor=#E9E9E9
| 565484 ||  || — || June 3, 2014 || Haleakala || Pan-STARRS ||  || align=right | 2.2 km || 
|-id=485 bgcolor=#E9E9E9
| 565485 ||  || — || January 17, 2008 || Mount Lemmon || Mount Lemmon Survey ||  || align=right | 2.3 km || 
|-id=486 bgcolor=#E9E9E9
| 565486 ||  || — || July 1, 2014 || Haleakala || Pan-STARRS ||  || align=right | 1.2 km || 
|-id=487 bgcolor=#E9E9E9
| 565487 ||  || — || April 24, 2009 || Mount Lemmon || Mount Lemmon Survey ||  || align=right data-sort-value="0.71" | 710 m || 
|-id=488 bgcolor=#E9E9E9
| 565488 ||  || — || January 19, 2008 || Mount Lemmon || Mount Lemmon Survey ||  || align=right | 1.5 km || 
|-id=489 bgcolor=#fefefe
| 565489 ||  || — || October 8, 2008 || Kitt Peak || Spacewatch ||  || align=right data-sort-value="0.84" | 840 m || 
|-id=490 bgcolor=#fefefe
| 565490 ||  || — || October 9, 2007 || Mount Lemmon || Mount Lemmon Survey ||  || align=right data-sort-value="0.89" | 890 m || 
|-id=491 bgcolor=#E9E9E9
| 565491 ||  || — || October 3, 2003 || Kitt Peak || Spacewatch ||  || align=right | 1.3 km || 
|-id=492 bgcolor=#fefefe
| 565492 ||  || — || October 10, 2004 || Kitt Peak || Spacewatch || V || align=right data-sort-value="0.95" | 950 m || 
|-id=493 bgcolor=#fefefe
| 565493 ||  || — || February 24, 2006 || Kitt Peak || Spacewatch ||  || align=right data-sort-value="0.65" | 650 m || 
|-id=494 bgcolor=#E9E9E9
| 565494 ||  || — || January 19, 2008 || Mount Lemmon || Mount Lemmon Survey ||  || align=right | 1.5 km || 
|-id=495 bgcolor=#E9E9E9
| 565495 ||  || — || April 13, 2004 || Palomar || NEAT ||  || align=right | 1.7 km || 
|-id=496 bgcolor=#fefefe
| 565496 ||  || — || February 15, 2010 || Mount Lemmon || Mount Lemmon Survey ||  || align=right data-sort-value="0.72" | 720 m || 
|-id=497 bgcolor=#fefefe
| 565497 ||  || — || February 16, 2010 || Kitt Peak || Spacewatch ||  || align=right data-sort-value="0.59" | 590 m || 
|-id=498 bgcolor=#fefefe
| 565498 ||  || — || December 30, 2005 || Kitt Peak || Spacewatch ||  || align=right data-sort-value="0.61" | 610 m || 
|-id=499 bgcolor=#fefefe
| 565499 ||  || — || April 7, 2006 || Kitt Peak || Spacewatch ||  || align=right data-sort-value="0.58" | 580 m || 
|-id=500 bgcolor=#fefefe
| 565500 ||  || — || December 25, 2005 || Kitt Peak || Spacewatch || V || align=right data-sort-value="0.59" | 590 m || 
|}

565501–565600 

|-bgcolor=#fefefe
| 565501 ||  || — || May 28, 2014 || Mount Lemmon || Mount Lemmon Survey ||  || align=right data-sort-value="0.63" | 630 m || 
|-id=502 bgcolor=#fefefe
| 565502 ||  || — || September 15, 2012 || Catalina || CSS ||  || align=right data-sort-value="0.90" | 900 m || 
|-id=503 bgcolor=#fefefe
| 565503 ||  || — || September 21, 2008 || Kitt Peak || Spacewatch ||  || align=right data-sort-value="0.73" | 730 m || 
|-id=504 bgcolor=#fefefe
| 565504 ||  || — || December 7, 2001 || Kitt Peak || Spacewatch || MAS || align=right data-sort-value="0.68" | 680 m || 
|-id=505 bgcolor=#fefefe
| 565505 ||  || — || November 26, 2009 || Mount Lemmon || Mount Lemmon Survey ||  || align=right data-sort-value="0.77" | 770 m || 
|-id=506 bgcolor=#E9E9E9
| 565506 ||  || — || February 2, 2000 || Kitt Peak || Spacewatch || MAR || align=right | 1.2 km || 
|-id=507 bgcolor=#E9E9E9
| 565507 ||  || — || March 14, 2013 || Kitt Peak || Spacewatch ||  || align=right data-sort-value="0.86" | 860 m || 
|-id=508 bgcolor=#E9E9E9
| 565508 ||  || — || December 28, 2007 || Kitt Peak || Spacewatch ||  || align=right | 1.8 km || 
|-id=509 bgcolor=#E9E9E9
| 565509 ||  || — || October 21, 2003 || Kitt Peak || Spacewatch ||  || align=right | 1.2 km || 
|-id=510 bgcolor=#fefefe
| 565510 ||  || — || October 24, 2008 || Kitt Peak || Spacewatch ||  || align=right | 1.0 km || 
|-id=511 bgcolor=#E9E9E9
| 565511 ||  || — || March 7, 2013 || Kitt Peak || SSS ||  || align=right | 1.7 km || 
|-id=512 bgcolor=#E9E9E9
| 565512 ||  || — || September 14, 2007 || Mauna Kea || Mauna Kea Obs. ||  || align=right | 1.0 km || 
|-id=513 bgcolor=#E9E9E9
| 565513 ||  || — || January 21, 2013 || Haleakala || Pan-STARRS ||  || align=right | 1.4 km || 
|-id=514 bgcolor=#fefefe
| 565514 ||  || — || January 3, 2013 || Mount Lemmon || Mount Lemmon Survey ||  || align=right | 1.00 km || 
|-id=515 bgcolor=#fefefe
| 565515 ||  || — || September 23, 2011 || Kitt Peak || Spacewatch || V || align=right data-sort-value="0.75" | 750 m || 
|-id=516 bgcolor=#E9E9E9
| 565516 ||  || — || October 20, 2011 || Haleakala || Pan-STARRS ||  || align=right | 1.5 km || 
|-id=517 bgcolor=#fefefe
| 565517 ||  || — || January 21, 2006 || Mount Lemmon || Mount Lemmon Survey ||  || align=right | 1.2 km || 
|-id=518 bgcolor=#fefefe
| 565518 ||  || — || December 6, 2005 || Kitt Peak || Spacewatch ||  || align=right | 1.0 km || 
|-id=519 bgcolor=#fefefe
| 565519 ||  || — || February 2, 2006 || Mount Lemmon || Mount Lemmon Survey ||  || align=right data-sort-value="0.85" | 850 m || 
|-id=520 bgcolor=#fefefe
| 565520 ||  || — || January 7, 2006 || Mount Lemmon || Mount Lemmon Survey || MAS || align=right data-sort-value="0.62" | 620 m || 
|-id=521 bgcolor=#fefefe
| 565521 ||  || — || April 13, 2010 || Mount Lemmon || Mount Lemmon Survey ||  || align=right data-sort-value="0.92" | 920 m || 
|-id=522 bgcolor=#E9E9E9
| 565522 ||  || — || November 13, 2007 || Cerro Burek || Alianza S4 Obs. || MAR || align=right | 1.1 km || 
|-id=523 bgcolor=#E9E9E9
| 565523 ||  || — || April 12, 2013 || Haleakala || Pan-STARRS ||  || align=right | 1.5 km || 
|-id=524 bgcolor=#E9E9E9
| 565524 ||  || — || March 14, 2013 || Kitt Peak || Spacewatch ||  || align=right data-sort-value="0.81" | 810 m || 
|-id=525 bgcolor=#fefefe
| 565525 ||  || — || January 16, 2013 || Mount Lemmon || Mount Lemmon Survey ||  || align=right data-sort-value="0.61" | 610 m || 
|-id=526 bgcolor=#E9E9E9
| 565526 ||  || — || August 20, 2014 || Haleakala || Pan-STARRS ||  || align=right | 1.3 km || 
|-id=527 bgcolor=#E9E9E9
| 565527 ||  || — || November 3, 2011 || Mount Lemmon || Mount Lemmon Survey ||  || align=right data-sort-value="0.80" | 800 m || 
|-id=528 bgcolor=#E9E9E9
| 565528 ||  || — || April 12, 2005 || Kitt Peak || Spacewatch ||  || align=right data-sort-value="0.69" | 690 m || 
|-id=529 bgcolor=#E9E9E9
| 565529 ||  || — || July 1, 2014 || Haleakala || Pan-STARRS ||  || align=right data-sort-value="0.72" | 720 m || 
|-id=530 bgcolor=#E9E9E9
| 565530 ||  || — || August 22, 2014 || Haleakala || Pan-STARRS ||  || align=right | 1.3 km || 
|-id=531 bgcolor=#E9E9E9
| 565531 ||  || — || April 10, 2013 || Haleakala || Pan-STARRS ||  || align=right | 1.2 km || 
|-id=532 bgcolor=#E9E9E9
| 565532 ||  || — || February 24, 2017 || Haleakala || Pan-STARRS ||  || align=right | 1.6 km || 
|-id=533 bgcolor=#E9E9E9
| 565533 ||  || — || February 21, 2017 || Haleakala || Pan-STARRS ||  || align=right | 1.6 km || 
|-id=534 bgcolor=#fefefe
| 565534 ||  || — || January 23, 2006 || Mount Lemmon || Mount Lemmon Survey ||  || align=right data-sort-value="0.52" | 520 m || 
|-id=535 bgcolor=#E9E9E9
| 565535 ||  || — || February 16, 2017 || Haleakala || Pan-STARRS ||  || align=right | 1.2 km || 
|-id=536 bgcolor=#d6d6d6
| 565536 ||  || — || February 25, 2017 || Haleakala || Pan-STARRS ||  || align=right | 2.4 km || 
|-id=537 bgcolor=#E9E9E9
| 565537 ||  || — || December 29, 2011 || Mount Lemmon || Mount Lemmon Survey ||  || align=right | 2.6 km || 
|-id=538 bgcolor=#E9E9E9
| 565538 ||  || — || December 4, 2007 || Catalina || CSS ||  || align=right | 1.6 km || 
|-id=539 bgcolor=#d6d6d6
| 565539 ||  || — || July 1, 2013 || Siding Spring || SSS ||  || align=right | 3.2 km || 
|-id=540 bgcolor=#E9E9E9
| 565540 ||  || — || September 15, 2010 || Mount Lemmon || Mount Lemmon Survey ||  || align=right | 1.6 km || 
|-id=541 bgcolor=#E9E9E9
| 565541 ||  || — || August 23, 2014 || Haleakala || Pan-STARRS ||  || align=right | 1.6 km || 
|-id=542 bgcolor=#fefefe
| 565542 ||  || — || March 26, 2003 || Kitt Peak || Spacewatch ||  || align=right data-sort-value="0.98" | 980 m || 
|-id=543 bgcolor=#E9E9E9
| 565543 ||  || — || October 26, 2011 || Haleakala || Pan-STARRS ||  || align=right | 1.2 km || 
|-id=544 bgcolor=#E9E9E9
| 565544 ||  || — || October 24, 2011 || Haleakala || Pan-STARRS ||  || align=right data-sort-value="0.95" | 950 m || 
|-id=545 bgcolor=#E9E9E9
| 565545 ||  || — || June 30, 2014 || Haleakala || Pan-STARRS ||  || align=right | 1.3 km || 
|-id=546 bgcolor=#E9E9E9
| 565546 ||  || — || July 27, 2005 || Palomar || NEAT ||  || align=right | 2.7 km || 
|-id=547 bgcolor=#E9E9E9
| 565547 ||  || — || February 17, 2004 || Palomar || NEAT ||  || align=right | 1.9 km || 
|-id=548 bgcolor=#fefefe
| 565548 ||  || — || February 3, 2006 || Mount Lemmon || Mount Lemmon Survey ||  || align=right | 1.1 km || 
|-id=549 bgcolor=#fefefe
| 565549 ||  || — || September 23, 2008 || Mount Lemmon || Mount Lemmon Survey ||  || align=right data-sort-value="0.87" | 870 m || 
|-id=550 bgcolor=#fefefe
| 565550 ||  || — || April 13, 2004 || Kitt Peak || Spacewatch ||  || align=right data-sort-value="0.77" | 770 m || 
|-id=551 bgcolor=#E9E9E9
| 565551 ||  || — || October 9, 2008 || Mount Lemmon || Mount Lemmon Survey ||  || align=right | 1.1 km || 
|-id=552 bgcolor=#fefefe
| 565552 ||  || — || October 30, 2011 || Kitt Peak || Spacewatch ||  || align=right data-sort-value="0.88" | 880 m || 
|-id=553 bgcolor=#fefefe
| 565553 ||  || — || September 6, 2015 || Catalina || CSS ||  || align=right data-sort-value="0.75" | 750 m || 
|-id=554 bgcolor=#fefefe
| 565554 ||  || — || February 20, 2006 || Kitt Peak || Spacewatch ||  || align=right data-sort-value="0.80" | 800 m || 
|-id=555 bgcolor=#fefefe
| 565555 ||  || — || July 24, 2015 || Haleakala || Pan-STARRS ||  || align=right data-sort-value="0.66" | 660 m || 
|-id=556 bgcolor=#E9E9E9
| 565556 ||  || — || September 11, 2010 || Mount Lemmon || Mount Lemmon Survey ||  || align=right data-sort-value="0.90" | 900 m || 
|-id=557 bgcolor=#E9E9E9
| 565557 ||  || — || October 21, 2007 || Kitt Peak || Spacewatch ||  || align=right | 1.0 km || 
|-id=558 bgcolor=#E9E9E9
| 565558 ||  || — || March 13, 2013 || Palomar || PTF ||  || align=right data-sort-value="0.98" | 980 m || 
|-id=559 bgcolor=#fefefe
| 565559 ||  || — || August 12, 2015 || Haleakala || Pan-STARRS ||  || align=right data-sort-value="0.84" | 840 m || 
|-id=560 bgcolor=#E9E9E9
| 565560 ||  || — || February 1, 2003 || Palomar || NEAT ||  || align=right | 2.3 km || 
|-id=561 bgcolor=#fefefe
| 565561 ||  || — || January 23, 2006 || Kitt Peak || Spacewatch ||  || align=right data-sort-value="0.66" | 660 m || 
|-id=562 bgcolor=#E9E9E9
| 565562 ||  || — || March 26, 2004 || Kitt Peak || Spacewatch ||  || align=right | 1.4 km || 
|-id=563 bgcolor=#fefefe
| 565563 ||  || — || October 8, 2008 || Kitt Peak || Spacewatch ||  || align=right data-sort-value="0.76" | 760 m || 
|-id=564 bgcolor=#fefefe
| 565564 ||  || — || November 18, 2008 || Kitt Peak || Spacewatch ||  || align=right data-sort-value="0.81" | 810 m || 
|-id=565 bgcolor=#E9E9E9
| 565565 ||  || — || September 25, 2005 || Kitt Peak || Spacewatch ||  || align=right | 1.5 km || 
|-id=566 bgcolor=#fefefe
| 565566 ||  || — || June 24, 2007 || Lulin || LUSS ||  || align=right | 1.0 km || 
|-id=567 bgcolor=#fefefe
| 565567 ||  || — || October 31, 2012 || Haleakala || Pan-STARRS ||  || align=right data-sort-value="0.89" | 890 m || 
|-id=568 bgcolor=#E9E9E9
| 565568 ||  || — || April 5, 2013 || Palomar || PTF ||  || align=right data-sort-value="0.87" | 870 m || 
|-id=569 bgcolor=#E9E9E9
| 565569 ||  || — || December 1, 1994 || Kitt Peak || Spacewatch ||  || align=right | 1.4 km || 
|-id=570 bgcolor=#E9E9E9
| 565570 ||  || — || February 23, 2017 || Mount Lemmon || Mount Lemmon Survey ||  || align=right | 1.1 km || 
|-id=571 bgcolor=#E9E9E9
| 565571 ||  || — || November 24, 2011 || Zelenchukskaya Stn || T. V. Kryachko, B. Satovski ||  || align=right | 1.9 km || 
|-id=572 bgcolor=#fefefe
| 565572 ||  || — || November 16, 2001 || Kitt Peak || Spacewatch ||  || align=right data-sort-value="0.67" | 670 m || 
|-id=573 bgcolor=#E9E9E9
| 565573 ||  || — || October 27, 2006 || Mount Lemmon || Mount Lemmon Survey ||  || align=right | 1.2 km || 
|-id=574 bgcolor=#E9E9E9
| 565574 ||  || — || September 29, 2009 || Mount Lemmon || Mount Lemmon Survey ||  || align=right | 2.1 km || 
|-id=575 bgcolor=#d6d6d6
| 565575 ||  || — || March 16, 2007 || Mount Lemmon || Mount Lemmon Survey ||  || align=right | 2.9 km || 
|-id=576 bgcolor=#E9E9E9
| 565576 ||  || — || May 15, 2013 || Haleakala || Pan-STARRS ||  || align=right | 1.4 km || 
|-id=577 bgcolor=#E9E9E9
| 565577 ||  || — || December 29, 2011 || Mount Lemmon || Mount Lemmon Survey ||  || align=right | 1.5 km || 
|-id=578 bgcolor=#E9E9E9
| 565578 ||  || — || April 17, 2013 || Haleakala || Pan-STARRS ||  || align=right data-sort-value="0.87" | 870 m || 
|-id=579 bgcolor=#E9E9E9
| 565579 ||  || — || May 8, 2013 || Haleakala || Pan-STARRS ||  || align=right | 1.3 km || 
|-id=580 bgcolor=#E9E9E9
| 565580 ||  || — || September 23, 2015 || Haleakala || Pan-STARRS ||  || align=right | 1.2 km || 
|-id=581 bgcolor=#E9E9E9
| 565581 ||  || — || July 27, 2014 || Haleakala || Pan-STARRS ||  || align=right data-sort-value="0.98" | 980 m || 
|-id=582 bgcolor=#fefefe
| 565582 ||  || — || November 30, 2008 || Kitt Peak || Spacewatch ||  || align=right data-sort-value="0.76" | 760 m || 
|-id=583 bgcolor=#fefefe
| 565583 ||  || — || February 6, 2013 || Nogales || M. Schwartz, P. R. Holvorcem ||  || align=right data-sort-value="0.63" | 630 m || 
|-id=584 bgcolor=#E9E9E9
| 565584 ||  || — || February 26, 2009 || Kitt Peak || Spacewatch ||  || align=right data-sort-value="0.98" | 980 m || 
|-id=585 bgcolor=#fefefe
| 565585 ||  || — || September 22, 1995 || Kitt Peak || Spacewatch ||  || align=right data-sort-value="0.85" | 850 m || 
|-id=586 bgcolor=#E9E9E9
| 565586 ||  || — || March 17, 2005 || Kitt Peak || Spacewatch ||  || align=right data-sort-value="0.92" | 920 m || 
|-id=587 bgcolor=#E9E9E9
| 565587 ||  || — || March 4, 2013 || Haleakala || Pan-STARRS ||  || align=right data-sort-value="0.98" | 980 m || 
|-id=588 bgcolor=#fefefe
| 565588 ||  || — || March 5, 2006 || Kitt Peak || Spacewatch ||  || align=right data-sort-value="0.84" | 840 m || 
|-id=589 bgcolor=#fefefe
| 565589 ||  || — || April 2, 2006 || Kitt Peak || Spacewatch ||  || align=right data-sort-value="0.77" | 770 m || 
|-id=590 bgcolor=#E9E9E9
| 565590 ||  || — || October 22, 2011 || Mount Lemmon || Mount Lemmon Survey ||  || align=right data-sort-value="0.85" | 850 m || 
|-id=591 bgcolor=#fefefe
| 565591 ||  || — || September 19, 2001 || Socorro || LINEAR ||  || align=right data-sort-value="0.70" | 700 m || 
|-id=592 bgcolor=#E9E9E9
| 565592 ||  || — || April 21, 2009 || Mount Lemmon || Mount Lemmon Survey ||  || align=right data-sort-value="0.98" | 980 m || 
|-id=593 bgcolor=#E9E9E9
| 565593 ||  || — || December 23, 2012 || Haleakala || Pan-STARRS ||  || align=right | 1.4 km || 
|-id=594 bgcolor=#E9E9E9
| 565594 ||  || — || April 8, 1996 || Haleakala || AMOS ||  || align=right | 1.7 km || 
|-id=595 bgcolor=#E9E9E9
| 565595 ||  || — || March 5, 2013 || Haleakala || Pan-STARRS ||  || align=right | 1.0 km || 
|-id=596 bgcolor=#E9E9E9
| 565596 ||  || — || August 4, 2014 || Haleakala || Pan-STARRS ||  || align=right data-sort-value="0.89" | 890 m || 
|-id=597 bgcolor=#E9E9E9
| 565597 ||  || — || November 11, 2006 || Kitt Peak || Spacewatch ||  || align=right | 2.8 km || 
|-id=598 bgcolor=#E9E9E9
| 565598 ||  || — || September 12, 2015 || Haleakala || Pan-STARRS ||  || align=right | 1.7 km || 
|-id=599 bgcolor=#fefefe
| 565599 ||  || — || October 26, 2001 || Haleakala || AMOS ||  || align=right | 1.3 km || 
|-id=600 bgcolor=#fefefe
| 565600 ||  || — || December 23, 2012 || Haleakala || Pan-STARRS ||  || align=right data-sort-value="0.78" | 780 m || 
|}

565601–565700 

|-bgcolor=#fefefe
| 565601 ||  || — || September 23, 2015 || Haleakala || Pan-STARRS ||  || align=right data-sort-value="0.80" | 800 m || 
|-id=602 bgcolor=#E9E9E9
| 565602 ||  || — || October 11, 2015 || Mount Lemmon || Mount Lemmon Survey ||  || align=right | 1.0 km || 
|-id=603 bgcolor=#fefefe
| 565603 ||  || — || December 9, 2012 || Mount Lemmon || Mount Lemmon Survey ||  || align=right data-sort-value="0.89" | 890 m || 
|-id=604 bgcolor=#E9E9E9
| 565604 ||  || — || November 3, 2015 || Mount Lemmon || Mount Lemmon Survey ||  || align=right data-sort-value="0.62" | 620 m || 
|-id=605 bgcolor=#fefefe
| 565605 ||  || — || May 13, 2007 || Mount Lemmon || Mount Lemmon Survey ||  || align=right data-sort-value="0.89" | 890 m || 
|-id=606 bgcolor=#fefefe
| 565606 ||  || — || December 11, 2004 || Kitt Peak || Spacewatch ||  || align=right data-sort-value="0.89" | 890 m || 
|-id=607 bgcolor=#E9E9E9
| 565607 ||  || — || August 3, 2014 || Haleakala || Pan-STARRS ||  || align=right data-sort-value="0.78" | 780 m || 
|-id=608 bgcolor=#E9E9E9
| 565608 ||  || — || March 7, 2013 || Mount Lemmon || Mount Lemmon Survey ||  || align=right | 1.3 km || 
|-id=609 bgcolor=#E9E9E9
| 565609 ||  || — || August 29, 2006 || Catalina || CSS ||  || align=right | 2.0 km || 
|-id=610 bgcolor=#fefefe
| 565610 ||  || — || March 26, 2006 || Nashville || R. Clingan ||  || align=right data-sort-value="0.83" | 830 m || 
|-id=611 bgcolor=#E9E9E9
| 565611 ||  || — || June 18, 2010 || Mount Lemmon || Mount Lemmon Survey ||  || align=right | 1.00 km || 
|-id=612 bgcolor=#fefefe
| 565612 ||  || — || January 19, 2013 || Mount Lemmon || Mount Lemmon Survey ||  || align=right data-sort-value="0.61" | 610 m || 
|-id=613 bgcolor=#E9E9E9
| 565613 ||  || — || March 23, 2004 || Kitt Peak || Spacewatch ||  || align=right | 1.2 km || 
|-id=614 bgcolor=#fefefe
| 565614 ||  || — || August 10, 2007 || Kitt Peak || Spacewatch ||  || align=right | 1.0 km || 
|-id=615 bgcolor=#fefefe
| 565615 ||  || — || October 10, 2007 || Mount Lemmon || Mount Lemmon Survey ||  || align=right data-sort-value="0.70" | 700 m || 
|-id=616 bgcolor=#E9E9E9
| 565616 ||  || — || October 3, 2010 || Catalina || CSS ||  || align=right | 2.2 km || 
|-id=617 bgcolor=#E9E9E9
| 565617 ||  || — || August 12, 2015 || Haleakala || Pan-STARRS ||  || align=right data-sort-value="0.81" | 810 m || 
|-id=618 bgcolor=#fefefe
| 565618 ||  || — || October 25, 2003 || Kitt Peak || Spacewatch ||  || align=right data-sort-value="0.96" | 960 m || 
|-id=619 bgcolor=#E9E9E9
| 565619 ||  || — || October 19, 2006 || Kitt Peak || L. H. Wasserman ||  || align=right | 1.4 km || 
|-id=620 bgcolor=#E9E9E9
| 565620 ||  || — || September 14, 2010 || Mount Lemmon || Mount Lemmon Survey ||  || align=right data-sort-value="0.75" | 750 m || 
|-id=621 bgcolor=#fefefe
| 565621 ||  || — || January 16, 2013 || Mount Lemmon || Mount Lemmon Survey ||  || align=right data-sort-value="0.69" | 690 m || 
|-id=622 bgcolor=#fefefe
| 565622 ||  || — || July 2, 2015 || Haleakala || Pan-STARRS ||  || align=right data-sort-value="0.80" | 800 m || 
|-id=623 bgcolor=#fefefe
| 565623 ||  || — || December 18, 2012 || Oukaimeden || M. Ory ||  || align=right data-sort-value="0.76" | 760 m || 
|-id=624 bgcolor=#fefefe
| 565624 ||  || — || August 20, 2014 || Haleakala || Pan-STARRS ||  || align=right data-sort-value="0.61" | 610 m || 
|-id=625 bgcolor=#fefefe
| 565625 ||  || — || April 2, 2006 || Kitt Peak || Spacewatch ||  || align=right | 1.0 km || 
|-id=626 bgcolor=#E9E9E9
| 565626 ||  || — || June 17, 2005 || Mount Lemmon || Mount Lemmon Survey ||  || align=right data-sort-value="0.89" | 890 m || 
|-id=627 bgcolor=#E9E9E9
| 565627 ||  || — || November 20, 2007 || Mount Lemmon || Mount Lemmon Survey ||  || align=right | 1.3 km || 
|-id=628 bgcolor=#fefefe
| 565628 ||  || — || May 5, 2010 || Mount Lemmon || Mount Lemmon Survey ||  || align=right data-sort-value="0.77" | 770 m || 
|-id=629 bgcolor=#fefefe
| 565629 ||  || — || January 16, 2009 || Kitt Peak || Spacewatch ||  || align=right data-sort-value="0.66" | 660 m || 
|-id=630 bgcolor=#fefefe
| 565630 ||  || — || July 26, 2014 || Haleakala || Pan-STARRS ||  || align=right data-sort-value="0.80" | 800 m || 
|-id=631 bgcolor=#E9E9E9
| 565631 ||  || — || November 16, 2015 || Haleakala || Pan-STARRS ||  || align=right data-sort-value="0.98" | 980 m || 
|-id=632 bgcolor=#E9E9E9
| 565632 ||  || — || March 14, 2004 || Kitt Peak || Spacewatch ||  || align=right | 1.5 km || 
|-id=633 bgcolor=#E9E9E9
| 565633 ||  || — || February 2, 2008 || Kitt Peak || Spacewatch ||  || align=right | 1.6 km || 
|-id=634 bgcolor=#fefefe
| 565634 ||  || — || March 23, 2006 || Kitt Peak || Spacewatch ||  || align=right data-sort-value="0.53" | 530 m || 
|-id=635 bgcolor=#fefefe
| 565635 ||  || — || January 12, 2002 || Kitt Peak || Spacewatch ||  || align=right data-sort-value="0.57" | 570 m || 
|-id=636 bgcolor=#E9E9E9
| 565636 ||  || — || September 18, 2014 || Haleakala || Pan-STARRS ||  || align=right | 1.4 km || 
|-id=637 bgcolor=#E9E9E9
| 565637 ||  || — || February 10, 2008 || Anderson Mesa || LONEOS ||  || align=right | 1.5 km || 
|-id=638 bgcolor=#E9E9E9
| 565638 ||  || — || August 20, 2014 || Haleakala || Pan-STARRS ||  || align=right | 1.1 km || 
|-id=639 bgcolor=#E9E9E9
| 565639 ||  || — || March 12, 2000 || Kitt Peak || Spacewatch ||  || align=right | 1.7 km || 
|-id=640 bgcolor=#E9E9E9
| 565640 ||  || — || March 18, 2017 || Mount Lemmon || Mount Lemmon Survey ||  || align=right | 1.7 km || 
|-id=641 bgcolor=#E9E9E9
| 565641 ||  || — || March 19, 2013 || Haleakala || Pan-STARRS ||  || align=right data-sort-value="0.85" | 850 m || 
|-id=642 bgcolor=#E9E9E9
| 565642 ||  || — || February 16, 2004 || Catalina || CSS ||  || align=right | 1.5 km || 
|-id=643 bgcolor=#E9E9E9
| 565643 ||  || — || October 25, 2011 || Haleakala || Pan-STARRS ||  || align=right data-sort-value="0.91" | 910 m || 
|-id=644 bgcolor=#E9E9E9
| 565644 ||  || — || September 24, 2006 || Kitt Peak || Spacewatch ||  || align=right | 1.6 km || 
|-id=645 bgcolor=#E9E9E9
| 565645 ||  || — || January 29, 2012 || Mount Lemmon || Mount Lemmon Survey ||  || align=right | 2.1 km || 
|-id=646 bgcolor=#E9E9E9
| 565646 ||  || — || October 1, 2010 || Mount Lemmon || Mount Lemmon Survey ||  || align=right | 1.2 km || 
|-id=647 bgcolor=#fefefe
| 565647 ||  || — || April 19, 2006 || Mount Lemmon || Mount Lemmon Survey ||  || align=right data-sort-value="0.77" | 770 m || 
|-id=648 bgcolor=#fefefe
| 565648 ||  || — || March 2, 2006 || Kitt Peak || Spacewatch ||  || align=right data-sort-value="0.69" | 690 m || 
|-id=649 bgcolor=#fefefe
| 565649 ||  || — || June 21, 2010 || Mount Lemmon || Mount Lemmon Survey ||  || align=right data-sort-value="0.75" | 750 m || 
|-id=650 bgcolor=#E9E9E9
| 565650 ||  || — || February 27, 2004 || Kitt Peak || M. W. Buie, D. E. Trilling ||  || align=right | 1.3 km || 
|-id=651 bgcolor=#E9E9E9
| 565651 ||  || — || July 26, 2006 || Siding Spring || SSS ||  || align=right | 1.4 km || 
|-id=652 bgcolor=#fefefe
| 565652 ||  || — || December 1, 2008 || Kitt Peak || Spacewatch ||  || align=right data-sort-value="0.59" | 590 m || 
|-id=653 bgcolor=#fefefe
| 565653 ||  || — || November 30, 2008 || Mount Lemmon || Mount Lemmon Survey ||  || align=right data-sort-value="0.73" | 730 m || 
|-id=654 bgcolor=#fefefe
| 565654 ||  || — || September 4, 2011 || Haleakala || Pan-STARRS ||  || align=right data-sort-value="0.79" | 790 m || 
|-id=655 bgcolor=#fefefe
| 565655 ||  || — || April 9, 2002 || Palomar || NEAT ||  || align=right | 1.1 km || 
|-id=656 bgcolor=#fefefe
| 565656 ||  || — || April 2, 2013 || Haleakala || Pan-STARRS ||  || align=right data-sort-value="0.69" | 690 m || 
|-id=657 bgcolor=#fefefe
| 565657 ||  || — || January 30, 2006 || Kitt Peak || Spacewatch ||  || align=right data-sort-value="0.53" | 530 m || 
|-id=658 bgcolor=#E9E9E9
| 565658 ||  || — || April 30, 2009 || Kitt Peak || Spacewatch ||  || align=right data-sort-value="0.79" | 790 m || 
|-id=659 bgcolor=#E9E9E9
| 565659 ||  || — || April 11, 2013 || Kitt Peak || Spacewatch ||  || align=right | 1.1 km || 
|-id=660 bgcolor=#fefefe
| 565660 ||  || — || February 9, 2013 || Haleakala || Pan-STARRS ||  || align=right data-sort-value="0.67" | 670 m || 
|-id=661 bgcolor=#fefefe
| 565661 ||  || — || October 8, 2015 || Haleakala || Pan-STARRS ||  || align=right data-sort-value="0.77" | 770 m || 
|-id=662 bgcolor=#fefefe
| 565662 ||  || — || May 12, 2010 || Mount Lemmon || Mount Lemmon Survey ||  || align=right data-sort-value="0.84" | 840 m || 
|-id=663 bgcolor=#fefefe
| 565663 ||  || — || October 19, 2003 || Kitt Peak || Spacewatch ||  || align=right data-sort-value="0.91" | 910 m || 
|-id=664 bgcolor=#fefefe
| 565664 ||  || — || January 23, 2006 || Kitt Peak || Spacewatch ||  || align=right data-sort-value="0.64" | 640 m || 
|-id=665 bgcolor=#E9E9E9
| 565665 ||  || — || September 26, 2006 || Mount Lemmon || Mount Lemmon Survey ||  || align=right | 1.3 km || 
|-id=666 bgcolor=#fefefe
| 565666 ||  || — || December 30, 2005 || Mount Lemmon || Mount Lemmon Survey ||  || align=right data-sort-value="0.76" | 760 m || 
|-id=667 bgcolor=#E9E9E9
| 565667 ||  || — || October 20, 2006 || Kitt Peak || Spacewatch ||  || align=right | 1.4 km || 
|-id=668 bgcolor=#fefefe
| 565668 ||  || — || May 5, 2006 || Kitt Peak || Spacewatch ||  || align=right data-sort-value="0.79" | 790 m || 
|-id=669 bgcolor=#E9E9E9
| 565669 ||  || — || August 22, 2001 || Kitt Peak || Spacewatch ||  || align=right | 1.6 km || 
|-id=670 bgcolor=#E9E9E9
| 565670 ||  || — || February 10, 2008 || Kitt Peak || Spacewatch ||  || align=right | 2.0 km || 
|-id=671 bgcolor=#fefefe
| 565671 ||  || — || November 3, 2004 || Kitt Peak || Spacewatch ||  || align=right | 1.0 km || 
|-id=672 bgcolor=#E9E9E9
| 565672 ||  || — || August 19, 2014 || Haleakala || Pan-STARRS ||  || align=right data-sort-value="0.89" | 890 m || 
|-id=673 bgcolor=#E9E9E9
| 565673 ||  || — || February 3, 2012 || Mount Lemmon || Mount Lemmon Survey ||  || align=right | 1.7 km || 
|-id=674 bgcolor=#fefefe
| 565674 ||  || — || March 24, 2006 || Kitt Peak || Spacewatch ||  || align=right data-sort-value="0.79" | 790 m || 
|-id=675 bgcolor=#fefefe
| 565675 ||  || — || December 30, 2008 || Mount Lemmon || Mount Lemmon Survey ||  || align=right data-sort-value="0.84" | 840 m || 
|-id=676 bgcolor=#E9E9E9
| 565676 ||  || — || December 21, 2003 || Kitt Peak || Spacewatch ||  || align=right | 1.2 km || 
|-id=677 bgcolor=#E9E9E9
| 565677 ||  || — || November 24, 2011 || Haleakala || Pan-STARRS ||  || align=right | 1.2 km || 
|-id=678 bgcolor=#E9E9E9
| 565678 ||  || — || December 11, 2010 || Mount Lemmon || Mount Lemmon Survey ||  || align=right | 1.6 km || 
|-id=679 bgcolor=#E9E9E9
| 565679 ||  || — || April 18, 2009 || Kitt Peak || Spacewatch ||  || align=right | 1.0 km || 
|-id=680 bgcolor=#E9E9E9
| 565680 ||  || — || November 11, 2001 || Palomar || SDSS ||  || align=right | 2.3 km || 
|-id=681 bgcolor=#E9E9E9
| 565681 ||  || — || November 23, 2011 || Kitt Peak || Spacewatch ||  || align=right data-sort-value="0.95" | 950 m || 
|-id=682 bgcolor=#E9E9E9
| 565682 ||  || — || April 13, 2013 || Haleakala || Pan-STARRS ||  || align=right | 1.7 km || 
|-id=683 bgcolor=#E9E9E9
| 565683 ||  || — || March 19, 2009 || Kitt Peak || Spacewatch ||  || align=right | 1.2 km || 
|-id=684 bgcolor=#fefefe
| 565684 ||  || — || November 3, 2015 || Mount Lemmon || Mount Lemmon Survey ||  || align=right data-sort-value="0.68" | 680 m || 
|-id=685 bgcolor=#fefefe
| 565685 ||  || — || October 12, 2007 || Catalina || CSS ||  || align=right | 1.0 km || 
|-id=686 bgcolor=#E9E9E9
| 565686 ||  || — || December 4, 2007 || Mount Lemmon || Mount Lemmon Survey ||  || align=right | 1.3 km || 
|-id=687 bgcolor=#E9E9E9
| 565687 ||  || — || May 25, 2006 || Mount Lemmon || Mount Lemmon Survey ||  || align=right | 1.1 km || 
|-id=688 bgcolor=#d6d6d6
| 565688 ||  || — || December 10, 2009 || Mount Lemmon || Mount Lemmon Survey ||  || align=right | 2.3 km || 
|-id=689 bgcolor=#FA8072
| 565689 ||  || — || November 17, 2007 || Catalina || CSS ||  || align=right | 1.4 km || 
|-id=690 bgcolor=#E9E9E9
| 565690 ||  || — || November 17, 2007 || Mount Lemmon || Mount Lemmon Survey ||  || align=right data-sort-value="0.83" | 830 m || 
|-id=691 bgcolor=#E9E9E9
| 565691 ||  || — || October 26, 2011 || Haleakala || Pan-STARRS ||  || align=right data-sort-value="0.94" | 940 m || 
|-id=692 bgcolor=#fefefe
| 565692 ||  || — || April 14, 2010 || Mount Lemmon || Mount Lemmon Survey ||  || align=right data-sort-value="0.72" | 720 m || 
|-id=693 bgcolor=#fefefe
| 565693 ||  || — || December 4, 2008 || Mount Lemmon || Mount Lemmon Survey ||  || align=right data-sort-value="0.73" | 730 m || 
|-id=694 bgcolor=#d6d6d6
| 565694 ||  || — || August 28, 2014 || Haleakala || Pan-STARRS ||  || align=right | 2.5 km || 
|-id=695 bgcolor=#fefefe
| 565695 ||  || — || September 3, 2008 || Kitt Peak || Spacewatch ||  || align=right data-sort-value="0.64" | 640 m || 
|-id=696 bgcolor=#fefefe
| 565696 ||  || — || December 21, 2012 || Mount Lemmon || Mount Lemmon Survey ||  || align=right data-sort-value="0.67" | 670 m || 
|-id=697 bgcolor=#E9E9E9
| 565697 ||  || — || March 13, 2013 || Mount Lemmon || Mount Lemmon Survey ||  || align=right data-sort-value="0.75" | 750 m || 
|-id=698 bgcolor=#E9E9E9
| 565698 ||  || — || January 18, 2004 || Catalina || CSS ||  || align=right | 1.8 km || 
|-id=699 bgcolor=#fefefe
| 565699 ||  || — || December 22, 2008 || Mount Lemmon || Mount Lemmon Survey ||  || align=right data-sort-value="0.81" | 810 m || 
|-id=700 bgcolor=#fefefe
| 565700 ||  || — || February 13, 2002 || Kitt Peak || Spacewatch ||  || align=right | 1.0 km || 
|}

565701–565800 

|-bgcolor=#E9E9E9
| 565701 ||  || — || September 19, 2011 || Mount Lemmon || Mount Lemmon Survey ||  || align=right data-sort-value="0.80" | 800 m || 
|-id=702 bgcolor=#E9E9E9
| 565702 ||  || — || June 29, 2014 || Mount Lemmon || Mount Lemmon Survey ||  || align=right | 1.4 km || 
|-id=703 bgcolor=#fefefe
| 565703 ||  || — || July 4, 2010 || Kitt Peak || Spacewatch ||  || align=right data-sort-value="0.69" | 690 m || 
|-id=704 bgcolor=#fefefe
| 565704 ||  || — || September 15, 2007 || Mount Lemmon || Mount Lemmon Survey ||  || align=right data-sort-value="0.72" | 720 m || 
|-id=705 bgcolor=#E9E9E9
| 565705 ||  || — || September 23, 2015 || Haleakala || Pan-STARRS ||  || align=right | 1.3 km || 
|-id=706 bgcolor=#E9E9E9
| 565706 ||  || — || August 31, 2014 || Mount Lemmon || Mount Lemmon Survey ||  || align=right | 1.4 km || 
|-id=707 bgcolor=#fefefe
| 565707 ||  || — || January 22, 1998 || Kitt Peak || Spacewatch ||  || align=right data-sort-value="0.70" | 700 m || 
|-id=708 bgcolor=#E9E9E9
| 565708 ||  || — || October 9, 2010 || Kitt Peak || Spacewatch ||  || align=right | 1.6 km || 
|-id=709 bgcolor=#E9E9E9
| 565709 ||  || — || February 17, 2013 || Kitt Peak || Spacewatch ||  || align=right data-sort-value="0.85" | 850 m || 
|-id=710 bgcolor=#fefefe
| 565710 ||  || — || October 27, 2005 || Catalina || CSS ||  || align=right data-sort-value="0.66" | 660 m || 
|-id=711 bgcolor=#E9E9E9
| 565711 ||  || — || October 12, 2007 || Kitt Peak || Spacewatch ||  || align=right data-sort-value="0.76" | 760 m || 
|-id=712 bgcolor=#E9E9E9
| 565712 ||  || — || November 2, 2010 || Mount Lemmon || Mount Lemmon Survey ||  || align=right | 1.4 km || 
|-id=713 bgcolor=#E9E9E9
| 565713 ||  || — || September 19, 2010 || Kitt Peak || Spacewatch ||  || align=right | 1.6 km || 
|-id=714 bgcolor=#E9E9E9
| 565714 ||  || — || February 28, 2008 || Mount Lemmon || Mount Lemmon Survey ||  || align=right | 1.4 km || 
|-id=715 bgcolor=#E9E9E9
| 565715 ||  || — || May 13, 2004 || Kitt Peak || Spacewatch ||  || align=right | 1.7 km || 
|-id=716 bgcolor=#E9E9E9
| 565716 ||  || — || November 2, 2007 || Mount Lemmon || Mount Lemmon Survey ||  || align=right data-sort-value="0.83" | 830 m || 
|-id=717 bgcolor=#E9E9E9
| 565717 ||  || — || September 9, 2015 || Haleakala || Pan-STARRS ||  || align=right | 1.4 km || 
|-id=718 bgcolor=#fefefe
| 565718 ||  || — || February 22, 2009 || Kitt Peak || Spacewatch ||  || align=right | 1.1 km || 
|-id=719 bgcolor=#fefefe
| 565719 ||  || — || September 10, 2015 || Haleakala || Pan-STARRS ||  || align=right data-sort-value="0.69" | 690 m || 
|-id=720 bgcolor=#E9E9E9
| 565720 ||  || — || July 27, 2014 || Haleakala || Pan-STARRS ||  || align=right data-sort-value="0.72" | 720 m || 
|-id=721 bgcolor=#fefefe
| 565721 ||  || — || September 13, 2007 || Mount Lemmon || Mount Lemmon Survey ||  || align=right data-sort-value="0.71" | 710 m || 
|-id=722 bgcolor=#fefefe
| 565722 ||  || — || February 16, 2013 || Kitt Peak || Spacewatch ||  || align=right data-sort-value="0.96" | 960 m || 
|-id=723 bgcolor=#E9E9E9
| 565723 ||  || — || September 30, 2006 || Mount Lemmon || Mount Lemmon Survey ||  || align=right data-sort-value="0.85" | 850 m || 
|-id=724 bgcolor=#E9E9E9
| 565724 ||  || — || April 5, 2000 || Socorro || LINEAR ||  || align=right | 1.8 km || 
|-id=725 bgcolor=#fefefe
| 565725 ||  || — || June 20, 2014 || Haleakala || Pan-STARRS ||  || align=right data-sort-value="0.75" | 750 m || 
|-id=726 bgcolor=#E9E9E9
| 565726 ||  || — || October 1, 2005 || Mount Lemmon || Mount Lemmon Survey ||  || align=right | 1.9 km || 
|-id=727 bgcolor=#E9E9E9
| 565727 ||  || — || March 25, 2003 || Palomar || NEAT ||  || align=right | 2.3 km || 
|-id=728 bgcolor=#E9E9E9
| 565728 ||  || — || March 23, 2003 || Apache Point || SDSS Collaboration ||  || align=right | 2.6 km || 
|-id=729 bgcolor=#E9E9E9
| 565729 ||  || — || April 15, 2013 || Haleakala || Pan-STARRS ||  || align=right | 1.5 km || 
|-id=730 bgcolor=#d6d6d6
| 565730 ||  || — || November 11, 2009 || Mount Lemmon || Mount Lemmon Survey ||  || align=right | 3.4 km || 
|-id=731 bgcolor=#E9E9E9
| 565731 ||  || — || September 17, 2014 || Haleakala || Pan-STARRS ||  || align=right data-sort-value="0.90" | 900 m || 
|-id=732 bgcolor=#E9E9E9
| 565732 ||  || — || March 15, 2007 || Mount Lemmon || Mount Lemmon Survey ||  || align=right | 2.9 km || 
|-id=733 bgcolor=#E9E9E9
| 565733 ||  || — || July 1, 2014 || Haleakala || Pan-STARRS ||  || align=right data-sort-value="0.96" | 960 m || 
|-id=734 bgcolor=#E9E9E9
| 565734 ||  || — || December 14, 2010 || Mount Lemmon || Mount Lemmon Survey ||  || align=right | 2.6 km || 
|-id=735 bgcolor=#E9E9E9
| 565735 ||  || — || September 19, 2014 || Haleakala || Pan-STARRS ||  || align=right | 1.2 km || 
|-id=736 bgcolor=#E9E9E9
| 565736 ||  || — || January 3, 2004 || Pla D'Arguines || R. Ferrando ||  || align=right data-sort-value="0.85" | 850 m || 
|-id=737 bgcolor=#E9E9E9
| 565737 ||  || — || March 19, 2004 || Palomar || NEAT ||  || align=right | 1.5 km || 
|-id=738 bgcolor=#fefefe
| 565738 ||  || — || December 1, 2005 || Mount Lemmon || Mount Lemmon Survey ||  || align=right data-sort-value="0.84" | 840 m || 
|-id=739 bgcolor=#fefefe
| 565739 ||  || — || April 5, 2002 || Palomar || NEAT ||  || align=right data-sort-value="0.75" | 750 m || 
|-id=740 bgcolor=#E9E9E9
| 565740 ||  || — || April 4, 2013 || Haleakala || Pan-STARRS ||  || align=right | 1.1 km || 
|-id=741 bgcolor=#E9E9E9
| 565741 ||  || — || March 4, 2017 || Mount Lemmon || Pan-STARRS ||  || align=right data-sort-value="0.95" | 950 m || 
|-id=742 bgcolor=#fefefe
| 565742 ||  || — || September 4, 2011 || Haleakala || Pan-STARRS ||  || align=right data-sort-value="0.62" | 620 m || 
|-id=743 bgcolor=#E9E9E9
| 565743 ||  || — || April 12, 2013 || Haleakala || Pan-STARRS ||  || align=right | 1.7 km || 
|-id=744 bgcolor=#fefefe
| 565744 ||  || — || June 24, 2014 || Haleakala || Pan-STARRS ||  || align=right data-sort-value="0.85" | 850 m || 
|-id=745 bgcolor=#E9E9E9
| 565745 ||  || — || January 19, 2013 || Mount Lemmon || Mount Lemmon Survey ||  || align=right | 1.2 km || 
|-id=746 bgcolor=#E9E9E9
| 565746 ||  || — || December 4, 2007 || Mount Lemmon || Mount Lemmon Survey ||  || align=right data-sort-value="0.85" | 850 m || 
|-id=747 bgcolor=#E9E9E9
| 565747 ||  || — || December 30, 2007 || Kitt Peak || Spacewatch ||  || align=right | 1.4 km || 
|-id=748 bgcolor=#fefefe
| 565748 ||  || — || August 3, 2014 || Haleakala || Pan-STARRS ||  || align=right data-sort-value="0.72" | 720 m || 
|-id=749 bgcolor=#fefefe
| 565749 ||  || — || January 25, 2009 || Kitt Peak || Spacewatch ||  || align=right data-sort-value="0.80" | 800 m || 
|-id=750 bgcolor=#E9E9E9
| 565750 ||  || — || April 11, 2004 || Palomar || NEAT || JUN || align=right data-sort-value="0.83" | 830 m || 
|-id=751 bgcolor=#E9E9E9
| 565751 ||  || — || September 23, 2015 || Haleakala || Pan-STARRS ||  || align=right | 1.1 km || 
|-id=752 bgcolor=#d6d6d6
| 565752 ||  || — || August 15, 2009 || Kitt Peak || Spacewatch ||  || align=right | 2.7 km || 
|-id=753 bgcolor=#E9E9E9
| 565753 ||  || — || October 24, 2011 || Mount Lemmon || Mount Lemmon Survey ||  || align=right data-sort-value="0.67" | 670 m || 
|-id=754 bgcolor=#E9E9E9
| 565754 ||  || — || November 26, 2011 || Haleakala || Pan-STARRS || JUN || align=right | 1.3 km || 
|-id=755 bgcolor=#E9E9E9
| 565755 ||  || — || October 10, 2015 || Haleakala || Pan-STARRS ||  || align=right | 1.2 km || 
|-id=756 bgcolor=#E9E9E9
| 565756 ||  || — || December 8, 1998 || Kitt Peak || Spacewatch ||  || align=right | 1.2 km || 
|-id=757 bgcolor=#E9E9E9
| 565757 ||  || — || April 16, 2013 || Haleakala || Pan-STARRS ||  || align=right | 1.3 km || 
|-id=758 bgcolor=#E9E9E9
| 565758 ||  || — || November 16, 2011 || Mount Lemmon || Mount Lemmon Survey ||  || align=right | 1.4 km || 
|-id=759 bgcolor=#E9E9E9
| 565759 ||  || — || November 23, 2006 || Kitt Peak || Spacewatch ||  || align=right | 1.8 km || 
|-id=760 bgcolor=#fefefe
| 565760 ||  || — || January 20, 2013 || Kitt Peak || Spacewatch ||  || align=right data-sort-value="0.63" | 630 m || 
|-id=761 bgcolor=#E9E9E9
| 565761 ||  || — || May 16, 2005 || Mount Lemmon || Mount Lemmon Survey ||  || align=right data-sort-value="0.70" | 700 m || 
|-id=762 bgcolor=#d6d6d6
| 565762 ||  || — || October 28, 1994 || Kitt Peak || Spacewatch ||  || align=right | 2.5 km || 
|-id=763 bgcolor=#d6d6d6
| 565763 ||  || — || September 26, 2014 || Mount Lemmon || Mount Lemmon Survey ||  || align=right | 2.3 km || 
|-id=764 bgcolor=#E9E9E9
| 565764 ||  || — || September 30, 2003 || Kitt Peak || Spacewatch ||  || align=right data-sort-value="0.94" | 940 m || 
|-id=765 bgcolor=#E9E9E9
| 565765 ||  || — || November 3, 2015 || Mount Lemmon || Mount Lemmon Survey ||  || align=right data-sort-value="0.64" | 640 m || 
|-id=766 bgcolor=#fefefe
| 565766 ||  || — || April 7, 2003 || Kitt Peak || Spacewatch ||  || align=right data-sort-value="0.79" | 790 m || 
|-id=767 bgcolor=#fefefe
| 565767 ||  || — || November 20, 2004 || Kitt Peak || Spacewatch || MAS || align=right data-sort-value="0.66" | 660 m || 
|-id=768 bgcolor=#fefefe
| 565768 ||  || — || November 18, 2008 || Kitt Peak || Spacewatch ||  || align=right data-sort-value="0.50" | 500 m || 
|-id=769 bgcolor=#fefefe
| 565769 ||  || — || April 4, 2010 || Kitt Peak || Spacewatch ||  || align=right data-sort-value="0.77" | 770 m || 
|-id=770 bgcolor=#E9E9E9
| 565770 ||  || — || April 10, 2013 || Haleakala || Pan-STARRS ||  || align=right data-sort-value="0.75" | 750 m || 
|-id=771 bgcolor=#E9E9E9
| 565771 ||  || — || August 10, 2007 || Kitt Peak || Spacewatch ||  || align=right | 1.2 km || 
|-id=772 bgcolor=#E9E9E9
| 565772 ||  || — || September 23, 2015 || Haleakala || Pan-STARRS ||  || align=right | 1.7 km || 
|-id=773 bgcolor=#E9E9E9
| 565773 ||  || — || April 19, 2013 || Mount Lemmon || Mount Lemmon Survey ||  || align=right | 1.1 km || 
|-id=774 bgcolor=#E9E9E9
| 565774 ||  || — || March 19, 2017 || Mount Lemmon || Mount Lemmon Survey ||  || align=right | 1.4 km || 
|-id=775 bgcolor=#E9E9E9
| 565775 ||  || — || November 1, 2006 || Mount Lemmon || Mount Lemmon Survey ||  || align=right | 1.5 km || 
|-id=776 bgcolor=#E9E9E9
| 565776 ||  || — || March 10, 2008 || Mount Lemmon || Mount Lemmon Survey || CLO || align=right | 2.2 km || 
|-id=777 bgcolor=#fefefe
| 565777 ||  || — || September 23, 2008 || Mount Lemmon || Mount Lemmon Survey ||  || align=right data-sort-value="0.81" | 810 m || 
|-id=778 bgcolor=#E9E9E9
| 565778 ||  || — || April 4, 2008 || Mount Lemmon || Mount Lemmon Survey ||  || align=right | 1.7 km || 
|-id=779 bgcolor=#E9E9E9
| 565779 ||  || — || March 16, 2013 || Kitt Peak || Spacewatch ||  || align=right data-sort-value="0.68" | 680 m || 
|-id=780 bgcolor=#E9E9E9
| 565780 Kopaszimre ||  ||  || October 4, 2011 || Piszkesteto || K. Sárneczky, T. Szalai ||  || align=right | 1.0 km || 
|-id=781 bgcolor=#E9E9E9
| 565781 ||  || — || April 12, 2013 || Haleakala || Pan-STARRS ||  || align=right data-sort-value="0.89" | 890 m || 
|-id=782 bgcolor=#E9E9E9
| 565782 ||  || — || February 7, 2008 || Kitt Peak || Spacewatch ||  || align=right | 1.6 km || 
|-id=783 bgcolor=#E9E9E9
| 565783 ||  || — || March 5, 2008 || Kitt Peak || Spacewatch ||  || align=right | 1.5 km || 
|-id=784 bgcolor=#fefefe
| 565784 ||  || — || March 26, 2007 || Mount Lemmon || Mount Lemmon Survey ||  || align=right data-sort-value="0.85" | 850 m || 
|-id=785 bgcolor=#fefefe
| 565785 ||  || — || January 22, 2013 || Mount Lemmon || Mount Lemmon Survey || V || align=right data-sort-value="0.69" | 690 m || 
|-id=786 bgcolor=#E9E9E9
| 565786 ||  || — || May 17, 2009 || Kitt Peak || Spacewatch ||  || align=right data-sort-value="0.70" | 700 m || 
|-id=787 bgcolor=#E9E9E9
| 565787 ||  || — || September 30, 2005 || Kitt Peak || Spacewatch ||  || align=right | 2.2 km || 
|-id=788 bgcolor=#E9E9E9
| 565788 ||  || — || June 2, 2014 || Haleakala || Pan-STARRS ||  || align=right data-sort-value="0.79" | 790 m || 
|-id=789 bgcolor=#E9E9E9
| 565789 ||  || — || April 20, 2004 || Socorro || LINEAR || MRX || align=right | 1.2 km || 
|-id=790 bgcolor=#fefefe
| 565790 ||  || — || February 5, 2013 || Kitt Peak || Spacewatch ||  || align=right data-sort-value="0.93" | 930 m || 
|-id=791 bgcolor=#E9E9E9
| 565791 ||  || — || September 17, 2001 || Anderson Mesa || LONEOS ||  || align=right | 2.8 km || 
|-id=792 bgcolor=#E9E9E9
| 565792 ||  || — || April 10, 2013 || Haleakala || Pan-STARRS ||  || align=right data-sort-value="0.71" | 710 m || 
|-id=793 bgcolor=#E9E9E9
| 565793 ||  || — || September 15, 2006 || Kitt Peak || Spacewatch ||  || align=right | 1.1 km || 
|-id=794 bgcolor=#E9E9E9
| 565794 ||  || — || March 19, 2013 || Haleakala || Pan-STARRS ||  || align=right data-sort-value="0.73" | 730 m || 
|-id=795 bgcolor=#fefefe
| 565795 ||  || — || November 4, 2007 || Mount Lemmon || Mount Lemmon Survey ||  || align=right | 1.1 km || 
|-id=796 bgcolor=#fefefe
| 565796 ||  || — || March 19, 2010 || Mount Lemmon || Mount Lemmon Survey ||  || align=right data-sort-value="0.76" | 760 m || 
|-id=797 bgcolor=#E9E9E9
| 565797 ||  || — || April 16, 2013 || Haleakala || Pan-STARRS ||  || align=right | 1.2 km || 
|-id=798 bgcolor=#fefefe
| 565798 ||  || — || May 6, 2003 || Kitt Peak || Spacewatch ||  || align=right data-sort-value="0.57" | 570 m || 
|-id=799 bgcolor=#E9E9E9
| 565799 ||  || — || April 18, 2013 || Kitt Peak || Spacewatch ||  || align=right | 1.2 km || 
|-id=800 bgcolor=#E9E9E9
| 565800 ||  || — || October 9, 2010 || Mount Lemmon || Mount Lemmon Survey ||  || align=right | 1.2 km || 
|}

565801–565900 

|-bgcolor=#fefefe
| 565801 ||  || — || February 16, 2010 || Kitt Peak || Spacewatch ||  || align=right data-sort-value="0.67" | 670 m || 
|-id=802 bgcolor=#fefefe
| 565802 ||  || — || October 10, 2015 || Catalina || CSS ||  || align=right data-sort-value="0.91" | 910 m || 
|-id=803 bgcolor=#fefefe
| 565803 ||  || — || December 1, 2005 || Kitt Peak || Spacewatch ||  || align=right data-sort-value="0.73" | 730 m || 
|-id=804 bgcolor=#fefefe
| 565804 ||  || — || September 30, 2008 || Mount Lemmon || Mount Lemmon Survey ||  || align=right data-sort-value="0.82" | 820 m || 
|-id=805 bgcolor=#fefefe
| 565805 ||  || — || February 24, 2006 || Mount Lemmon || Mount Lemmon Survey ||  || align=right data-sort-value="0.57" | 570 m || 
|-id=806 bgcolor=#fefefe
| 565806 ||  || — || January 22, 2006 || Mount Lemmon || Mount Lemmon Survey ||  || align=right data-sort-value="0.56" | 560 m || 
|-id=807 bgcolor=#E9E9E9
| 565807 ||  || — || March 19, 2013 || Haleakala || Pan-STARRS ||  || align=right data-sort-value="0.67" | 670 m || 
|-id=808 bgcolor=#E9E9E9
| 565808 ||  || — || April 13, 2013 || Kitt Peak || Mount Lemmon Survey ||  || align=right | 1.6 km || 
|-id=809 bgcolor=#fefefe
| 565809 ||  || — || December 29, 2008 || Kitt Peak || Spacewatch ||  || align=right | 1.0 km || 
|-id=810 bgcolor=#E9E9E9
| 565810 ||  || — || April 19, 2013 || Mount Lemmon || Mount Lemmon Survey ||  || align=right | 1.7 km || 
|-id=811 bgcolor=#fefefe
| 565811 ||  || — || February 22, 2017 || Mount Lemmon || Mount Lemmon Survey ||  || align=right data-sort-value="0.67" | 670 m || 
|-id=812 bgcolor=#E9E9E9
| 565812 ||  || — || November 2, 2010 || Mount Lemmon || Mount Lemmon Survey ||  || align=right data-sort-value="0.79" | 790 m || 
|-id=813 bgcolor=#E9E9E9
| 565813 ||  || — || August 31, 2005 || Kitt Peak || Spacewatch ||  || align=right | 1.4 km || 
|-id=814 bgcolor=#E9E9E9
| 565814 ||  || — || March 13, 2013 || Haleakala || Pan-STARRS ||  || align=right data-sort-value="0.91" | 910 m || 
|-id=815 bgcolor=#fefefe
| 565815 ||  || — || December 3, 2015 || Mount Lemmon || Mount Lemmon Survey ||  || align=right data-sort-value="0.63" | 630 m || 
|-id=816 bgcolor=#fefefe
| 565816 ||  || — || October 23, 2011 || Mount Lemmon || Mount Lemmon Survey ||  || align=right data-sort-value="0.80" | 800 m || 
|-id=817 bgcolor=#fefefe
| 565817 ||  || — || January 18, 2013 || Kitt Peak || Spacewatch ||  || align=right data-sort-value="0.95" | 950 m || 
|-id=818 bgcolor=#E9E9E9
| 565818 ||  || — || October 29, 2010 || Mount Lemmon || Mount Lemmon Survey ||  || align=right | 1.7 km || 
|-id=819 bgcolor=#E9E9E9
| 565819 ||  || — || November 2, 2011 || Kitt Peak || Spacewatch ||  || align=right | 1.2 km || 
|-id=820 bgcolor=#E9E9E9
| 565820 ||  || — || February 18, 2013 || Mount Lemmon || Mount Lemmon Survey ||  || align=right | 1.1 km || 
|-id=821 bgcolor=#fefefe
| 565821 ||  || — || January 10, 2013 || Kitt Peak || Spacewatch ||  || align=right data-sort-value="0.82" | 820 m || 
|-id=822 bgcolor=#E9E9E9
| 565822 ||  || — || April 16, 2004 || Kitt Peak || Spacewatch ||  || align=right | 1.4 km || 
|-id=823 bgcolor=#E9E9E9
| 565823 ||  || — || April 22, 2009 || Mount Lemmon || Mount Lemmon Survey ||  || align=right data-sort-value="0.88" | 880 m || 
|-id=824 bgcolor=#fefefe
| 565824 ||  || — || February 3, 2013 || Haleakala || Pan-STARRS ||  || align=right data-sort-value="0.64" | 640 m || 
|-id=825 bgcolor=#d6d6d6
| 565825 ||  || — || January 16, 2016 || Haleakala || Pan-STARRS ||  || align=right | 2.2 km || 
|-id=826 bgcolor=#fefefe
| 565826 ||  || — || April 21, 2006 || Kitt Peak || Spacewatch ||  || align=right data-sort-value="0.98" | 980 m || 
|-id=827 bgcolor=#fefefe
| 565827 ||  || — || May 31, 2014 || Haleakala || Pan-STARRS ||  || align=right data-sort-value="0.81" | 810 m || 
|-id=828 bgcolor=#E9E9E9
| 565828 ||  || — || August 4, 2014 || Haleakala || Pan-STARRS ||  || align=right data-sort-value="0.78" | 780 m || 
|-id=829 bgcolor=#E9E9E9
| 565829 ||  || — || March 31, 2008 || Mount Lemmon || Mount Lemmon Survey ||  || align=right | 1.6 km || 
|-id=830 bgcolor=#E9E9E9
| 565830 ||  || — || December 30, 2007 || Mount Lemmon || Mount Lemmon Survey ||  || align=right data-sort-value="0.78" | 780 m || 
|-id=831 bgcolor=#E9E9E9
| 565831 ||  || — || March 31, 2008 || Mount Lemmon || Mount Lemmon Survey ||  || align=right | 1.5 km || 
|-id=832 bgcolor=#E9E9E9
| 565832 ||  || — || April 10, 2003 || Kitt Peak || Spacewatch ||  || align=right | 2.4 km || 
|-id=833 bgcolor=#E9E9E9
| 565833 ||  || — || April 15, 2013 || Haleakala || Pan-STARRS ||  || align=right | 1.6 km || 
|-id=834 bgcolor=#E9E9E9
| 565834 ||  || — || September 18, 2006 || Kitt Peak || Spacewatch ||  || align=right data-sort-value="0.84" | 840 m || 
|-id=835 bgcolor=#E9E9E9
| 565835 ||  || — || April 28, 2001 || Kitt Peak || Spacewatch ||  || align=right data-sort-value="0.87" | 870 m || 
|-id=836 bgcolor=#E9E9E9
| 565836 ||  || — || January 18, 2008 || Mount Lemmon || Mount Lemmon Survey ||  || align=right | 1.5 km || 
|-id=837 bgcolor=#E9E9E9
| 565837 ||  || — || December 8, 2015 || Haleakala || Pan-STARRS ||  || align=right | 1.4 km || 
|-id=838 bgcolor=#E9E9E9
| 565838 ||  || — || October 11, 2010 || Mount Lemmon || Mount Lemmon Survey ||  || align=right | 1.6 km || 
|-id=839 bgcolor=#fefefe
| 565839 ||  || — || February 14, 2009 || Mount Lemmon || Mount Lemmon Survey ||  || align=right data-sort-value="0.79" | 790 m || 
|-id=840 bgcolor=#E9E9E9
| 565840 ||  || — || July 28, 2014 || Haleakala || Pan-STARRS ||  || align=right data-sort-value="0.91" | 910 m || 
|-id=841 bgcolor=#E9E9E9
| 565841 ||  || — || May 10, 2013 || Nogales || M. Schwartz, P. R. Holvorcem ||  || align=right | 1.9 km || 
|-id=842 bgcolor=#fefefe
| 565842 ||  || — || December 23, 2012 || Haleakala || Pan-STARRS ||  || align=right data-sort-value="0.60" | 600 m || 
|-id=843 bgcolor=#E9E9E9
| 565843 ||  || — || September 15, 2006 || Kitt Peak || Spacewatch ||  || align=right | 1.3 km || 
|-id=844 bgcolor=#E9E9E9
| 565844 ||  || — || December 8, 2015 || Haleakala || Pan-STARRS ||  || align=right data-sort-value="0.69" | 690 m || 
|-id=845 bgcolor=#E9E9E9
| 565845 ||  || — || February 23, 2012 || Kitt Peak || Spacewatch ||  || align=right | 1.9 km || 
|-id=846 bgcolor=#E9E9E9
| 565846 ||  || — || January 19, 2012 || Haleakala || Pan-STARRS ||  || align=right | 2.5 km || 
|-id=847 bgcolor=#E9E9E9
| 565847 ||  || — || November 1, 2011 || Mount Lemmon || Mount Lemmon Survey ||  || align=right | 1.5 km || 
|-id=848 bgcolor=#E9E9E9
| 565848 ||  || — || October 1, 2005 || Mount Lemmon || Mount Lemmon Survey ||  || align=right | 1.4 km || 
|-id=849 bgcolor=#E9E9E9
| 565849 ||  || — || November 4, 2005 || Mount Lemmon || Mount Lemmon Survey ||  || align=right | 2.6 km || 
|-id=850 bgcolor=#E9E9E9
| 565850 ||  || — || May 11, 2008 || Mount Lemmon || Mount Lemmon Survey ||  || align=right | 2.0 km || 
|-id=851 bgcolor=#E9E9E9
| 565851 ||  || — || December 29, 2011 || Mount Lemmon || Mount Lemmon Survey ||  || align=right | 1.0 km || 
|-id=852 bgcolor=#E9E9E9
| 565852 ||  || — || June 3, 2013 || Kitt Peak || Spacewatch ||  || align=right | 1.1 km || 
|-id=853 bgcolor=#E9E9E9
| 565853 ||  || — || May 31, 2008 || Kitt Peak || Spacewatch ||  || align=right | 1.9 km || 
|-id=854 bgcolor=#E9E9E9
| 565854 ||  || — || April 22, 2004 || Kitt Peak || Spacewatch ||  || align=right | 1.4 km || 
|-id=855 bgcolor=#E9E9E9
| 565855 ||  || — || September 10, 2010 || Mount Lemmon || Mount Lemmon Survey ||  || align=right | 1.5 km || 
|-id=856 bgcolor=#E9E9E9
| 565856 ||  || — || December 3, 2015 || Mount Lemmon || Mount Lemmon Survey ||  || align=right | 1.9 km || 
|-id=857 bgcolor=#E9E9E9
| 565857 ||  || — || March 22, 2004 || Nogales || P. R. Holvorcem, M. Schwartz ||  || align=right | 1.3 km || 
|-id=858 bgcolor=#E9E9E9
| 565858 ||  || — || April 1, 2017 || Haleakala || Pan-STARRS ||  || align=right | 1.4 km || 
|-id=859 bgcolor=#E9E9E9
| 565859 ||  || — || August 27, 2006 || Kitt Peak || Spacewatch ||  || align=right | 1.0 km || 
|-id=860 bgcolor=#E9E9E9
| 565860 ||  || — || November 18, 2007 || Mount Lemmon || Mount Lemmon Survey ||  || align=right data-sort-value="0.92" | 920 m || 
|-id=861 bgcolor=#E9E9E9
| 565861 ||  || — || January 29, 2011 || Haleakala || Pan-STARRS ||  || align=right | 1.9 km || 
|-id=862 bgcolor=#E9E9E9
| 565862 ||  || — || May 1, 2005 || Kitt Peak || Spacewatch ||  || align=right | 1.2 km || 
|-id=863 bgcolor=#fefefe
| 565863 ||  || — || September 12, 2015 || Haleakala || Pan-STARRS ||  || align=right data-sort-value="0.61" | 610 m || 
|-id=864 bgcolor=#E9E9E9
| 565864 ||  || — || October 24, 2015 || Mount Lemmon || Mount Lemmon Survey ||  || align=right data-sort-value="0.78" | 780 m || 
|-id=865 bgcolor=#E9E9E9
| 565865 ||  || — || April 17, 2013 || Haleakala || Pan-STARRS ||  || align=right | 1.6 km || 
|-id=866 bgcolor=#fefefe
| 565866 ||  || — || September 23, 2011 || Haleakala || Pan-STARRS ||  || align=right data-sort-value="0.86" | 860 m || 
|-id=867 bgcolor=#fefefe
| 565867 ||  || — || October 10, 2015 || Haleakala || Pan-STARRS ||  || align=right data-sort-value="0.73" | 730 m || 
|-id=868 bgcolor=#E9E9E9
| 565868 ||  || — || May 14, 2009 || Kitt Peak || Spacewatch ||  || align=right data-sort-value="0.88" | 880 m || 
|-id=869 bgcolor=#E9E9E9
| 565869 ||  || — || October 9, 2015 || Haleakala || Pan-STARRS ||  || align=right data-sort-value="0.96" | 960 m || 
|-id=870 bgcolor=#fefefe
| 565870 ||  || — || September 12, 2007 || Catalina || CSS ||  || align=right data-sort-value="0.85" | 850 m || 
|-id=871 bgcolor=#E9E9E9
| 565871 ||  || — || April 10, 2013 || Kitt Peak || Spacewatch ||  || align=right data-sort-value="0.84" | 840 m || 
|-id=872 bgcolor=#E9E9E9
| 565872 ||  || — || December 30, 2007 || Kitt Peak || Spacewatch ||  || align=right data-sort-value="0.85" | 850 m || 
|-id=873 bgcolor=#E9E9E9
| 565873 ||  || — || January 21, 2012 || Catalina || CSS ||  || align=right | 2.1 km || 
|-id=874 bgcolor=#fefefe
| 565874 ||  || — || June 26, 2014 || Haleakala || Pan-STARRS ||  || align=right | 1.1 km || 
|-id=875 bgcolor=#E9E9E9
| 565875 ||  || — || May 15, 2013 || Haleakala || Pan-STARRS ||  || align=right | 1.5 km || 
|-id=876 bgcolor=#E9E9E9
| 565876 ||  || — || September 20, 2006 || Palomar || NEAT ||  || align=right | 1.3 km || 
|-id=877 bgcolor=#E9E9E9
| 565877 ||  || — || November 24, 2003 || Kitt Peak || Spacewatch ||  || align=right data-sort-value="0.62" | 620 m || 
|-id=878 bgcolor=#fefefe
| 565878 ||  || — || May 12, 2010 || Kitt Peak || Spacewatch ||  || align=right data-sort-value="0.61" | 610 m || 
|-id=879 bgcolor=#E9E9E9
| 565879 ||  || — || May 23, 2001 || Apache Point || SDSS Collaboration ||  || align=right | 1.1 km || 
|-id=880 bgcolor=#E9E9E9
| 565880 ||  || — || August 25, 2014 || Haleakala || Pan-STARRS ||  || align=right | 2.3 km || 
|-id=881 bgcolor=#E9E9E9
| 565881 ||  || — || April 10, 2013 || Haleakala || Pan-STARRS ||  || align=right | 1.3 km || 
|-id=882 bgcolor=#E9E9E9
| 565882 ||  || — || September 11, 2010 || Mount Lemmon || Mount Lemmon Survey ||  || align=right | 1.3 km || 
|-id=883 bgcolor=#E9E9E9
| 565883 ||  || — || March 2, 2008 || Nogales || Spacewatch ||  || align=right | 1.4 km || 
|-id=884 bgcolor=#E9E9E9
| 565884 ||  || — || August 25, 2014 || Haleakala || Pan-STARRS ||  || align=right | 1.4 km || 
|-id=885 bgcolor=#E9E9E9
| 565885 ||  || — || January 2, 2012 || Mount Lemmon || Mount Lemmon Survey ||  || align=right | 1.6 km || 
|-id=886 bgcolor=#E9E9E9
| 565886 ||  || — || January 16, 2008 || Mount Lemmon || Mount Lemmon Survey ||  || align=right | 1.1 km || 
|-id=887 bgcolor=#E9E9E9
| 565887 ||  || — || December 26, 2011 || Kitt Peak || Spacewatch ||  || align=right data-sort-value="0.79" | 790 m || 
|-id=888 bgcolor=#E9E9E9
| 565888 ||  || — || April 15, 2013 || Haleakala || Pan-STARRS ||  || align=right | 1.5 km || 
|-id=889 bgcolor=#E9E9E9
| 565889 ||  || — || September 18, 2010 || Cerro Tololo || Mount Lemmon Survey ||  || align=right | 1.1 km || 
|-id=890 bgcolor=#E9E9E9
| 565890 ||  || — || November 10, 2014 || Haleakala || Pan-STARRS ||  || align=right | 2.3 km || 
|-id=891 bgcolor=#fefefe
| 565891 ||  || — || February 5, 2013 || Kitt Peak || Spacewatch ||  || align=right data-sort-value="0.74" | 740 m || 
|-id=892 bgcolor=#E9E9E9
| 565892 ||  || — || May 25, 2009 || Kitt Peak || Spacewatch ||  || align=right data-sort-value="0.85" | 850 m || 
|-id=893 bgcolor=#E9E9E9
| 565893 ||  || — || February 9, 2008 || Mount Lemmon || Mount Lemmon Survey ||  || align=right | 1.3 km || 
|-id=894 bgcolor=#E9E9E9
| 565894 ||  || — || December 4, 2015 || Haleakala || Pan-STARRS ||  || align=right data-sort-value="0.92" | 920 m || 
|-id=895 bgcolor=#E9E9E9
| 565895 ||  || — || May 16, 2013 || Haleakala || Pan-STARRS ||  || align=right data-sort-value="0.76" | 760 m || 
|-id=896 bgcolor=#E9E9E9
| 565896 ||  || — || February 26, 2008 || Mount Lemmon || Mount Lemmon Survey ||  || align=right | 1.2 km || 
|-id=897 bgcolor=#E9E9E9
| 565897 ||  || — || November 17, 2014 || Mount Lemmon || Mount Lemmon Survey ||  || align=right | 1.3 km || 
|-id=898 bgcolor=#E9E9E9
| 565898 ||  || — || March 26, 2008 || Mount Lemmon || Mount Lemmon Survey ||  || align=right | 1.3 km || 
|-id=899 bgcolor=#E9E9E9
| 565899 ||  || — || November 12, 2001 || Apache Point || SDSS Collaboration ||  || align=right | 1.6 km || 
|-id=900 bgcolor=#E9E9E9
| 565900 ||  || — || January 31, 2008 || Catalina || CSS ||  || align=right | 1.6 km || 
|}

565901–566000 

|-bgcolor=#E9E9E9
| 565901 ||  || — || February 22, 2017 || Mount Lemmon || Mount Lemmon Survey ||  || align=right | 1.2 km || 
|-id=902 bgcolor=#E9E9E9
| 565902 ||  || — || November 18, 2015 || Haleakala || Pan-STARRS ||  || align=right | 1.1 km || 
|-id=903 bgcolor=#E9E9E9
| 565903 ||  || — || December 5, 2007 || Kitt Peak || Spacewatch ||  || align=right data-sort-value="0.88" | 880 m || 
|-id=904 bgcolor=#E9E9E9
| 565904 ||  || — || May 14, 2005 || Mount Lemmon || Mount Lemmon Survey ||  || align=right data-sort-value="0.93" | 930 m || 
|-id=905 bgcolor=#E9E9E9
| 565905 ||  || — || January 22, 2012 || Haleakala || Pan-STARRS ||  || align=right | 2.3 km || 
|-id=906 bgcolor=#fefefe
| 565906 ||  || — || March 31, 2013 || Mount Lemmon || Mount Lemmon Survey ||  || align=right data-sort-value="0.75" | 750 m || 
|-id=907 bgcolor=#E9E9E9
| 565907 ||  || — || April 16, 2013 || Haleakala || Pan-STARRS ||  || align=right | 1.2 km || 
|-id=908 bgcolor=#E9E9E9
| 565908 ||  || — || April 15, 2013 || Haleakala || Pan-STARRS ||  || align=right | 1.3 km || 
|-id=909 bgcolor=#E9E9E9
| 565909 ||  || — || April 29, 2009 || Kitt Peak || Spacewatch ||  || align=right | 1.0 km || 
|-id=910 bgcolor=#E9E9E9
| 565910 ||  || — || February 2, 2008 || Catalina || CSS ||  || align=right | 1.6 km || 
|-id=911 bgcolor=#E9E9E9
| 565911 ||  || — || October 22, 2014 || Mount Lemmon || Mount Lemmon Survey ||  || align=right | 1.0 km || 
|-id=912 bgcolor=#E9E9E9
| 565912 ||  || — || December 31, 2007 || Mount Lemmon || Mount Lemmon Survey ||  || align=right | 1.4 km || 
|-id=913 bgcolor=#E9E9E9
| 565913 ||  || — || November 2, 2010 || Mount Lemmon || Mount Lemmon Survey ||  || align=right | 1.6 km || 
|-id=914 bgcolor=#fefefe
| 565914 ||  || — || June 28, 2014 || Haleakala || Pan-STARRS ||  || align=right data-sort-value="0.70" | 700 m || 
|-id=915 bgcolor=#E9E9E9
| 565915 ||  || — || April 11, 2005 || Kitt Peak || Spacewatch ||  || align=right data-sort-value="0.72" | 720 m || 
|-id=916 bgcolor=#E9E9E9
| 565916 ||  || — || March 22, 2004 || Anderson Mesa || LONEOS ||  || align=right | 1.8 km || 
|-id=917 bgcolor=#E9E9E9
| 565917 ||  || — || November 5, 2010 || Mount Lemmon || Mount Lemmon Survey ||  || align=right | 1.8 km || 
|-id=918 bgcolor=#E9E9E9
| 565918 ||  || — || April 15, 2013 || Haleakala || Pan-STARRS ||  || align=right | 1.2 km || 
|-id=919 bgcolor=#E9E9E9
| 565919 ||  || — || September 25, 2009 || Kitt Peak || Spacewatch ||  || align=right | 1.7 km || 
|-id=920 bgcolor=#E9E9E9
| 565920 ||  || — || April 1, 2017 || Haleakala || Pan-STARRS ||  || align=right | 1.4 km || 
|-id=921 bgcolor=#E9E9E9
| 565921 ||  || — || September 16, 2004 || Kitt Peak || Spacewatch ||  || align=right | 2.6 km || 
|-id=922 bgcolor=#E9E9E9
| 565922 ||  || — || October 26, 2005 || Kitt Peak || Spacewatch ||  || align=right | 1.8 km || 
|-id=923 bgcolor=#E9E9E9
| 565923 ||  || — || January 3, 2016 || Haleakala || Pan-STARRS ||  || align=right | 1.7 km || 
|-id=924 bgcolor=#d6d6d6
| 565924 ||  || — || September 6, 2007 || Siding Spring || SSS ||  || align=right | 4.1 km || 
|-id=925 bgcolor=#E9E9E9
| 565925 ||  || — || February 17, 2004 || Kitt Peak || Spacewatch ||  || align=right | 1.0 km || 
|-id=926 bgcolor=#E9E9E9
| 565926 ||  || — || February 8, 1999 || Kitt Peak || Spacewatch ||  || align=right | 1.5 km || 
|-id=927 bgcolor=#E9E9E9
| 565927 ||  || — || January 7, 2016 || Haleakala || Pan-STARRS ||  || align=right | 1.7 km || 
|-id=928 bgcolor=#E9E9E9
| 565928 ||  || — || November 21, 2014 || Haleakala || Pan-STARRS ||  || align=right | 1.6 km || 
|-id=929 bgcolor=#E9E9E9
| 565929 ||  || — || August 20, 2014 || Haleakala || Pan-STARRS ||  || align=right data-sort-value="0.75" | 750 m || 
|-id=930 bgcolor=#d6d6d6
| 565930 ||  || — || November 18, 2003 || Kitt Peak || Spacewatch ||  || align=right | 2.5 km || 
|-id=931 bgcolor=#E9E9E9
| 565931 ||  || — || February 23, 2012 || Mount Lemmon || Mount Lemmon Survey ||  || align=right | 1.6 km || 
|-id=932 bgcolor=#E9E9E9
| 565932 ||  || — || October 21, 2001 || Kitt Peak || Spacewatch ||  || align=right | 1.4 km || 
|-id=933 bgcolor=#E9E9E9
| 565933 ||  || — || November 1, 2010 || Mount Lemmon || Mount Lemmon Survey ||  || align=right | 1.2 km || 
|-id=934 bgcolor=#E9E9E9
| 565934 ||  || — || February 13, 2008 || Mount Lemmon || Mount Lemmon Survey ||  || align=right | 1.2 km || 
|-id=935 bgcolor=#E9E9E9
| 565935 ||  || — || November 16, 2006 || Mount Lemmon || Mount Lemmon Survey ||  || align=right data-sort-value="0.88" | 880 m || 
|-id=936 bgcolor=#E9E9E9
| 565936 ||  || — || September 12, 2009 || Kitt Peak || Spacewatch ||  || align=right | 2.2 km || 
|-id=937 bgcolor=#E9E9E9
| 565937 ||  || — || April 14, 2004 || Kitt Peak || Spacewatch ||  || align=right | 1.5 km || 
|-id=938 bgcolor=#E9E9E9
| 565938 ||  || — || December 13, 2006 || Mount Lemmon || Mount Lemmon Survey ||  || align=right | 1.4 km || 
|-id=939 bgcolor=#E9E9E9
| 565939 ||  || — || August 18, 2009 || Kitt Peak || Spacewatch ||  || align=right | 1.9 km || 
|-id=940 bgcolor=#E9E9E9
| 565940 ||  || — || March 22, 2012 || Mount Lemmon || Mount Lemmon Survey ||  || align=right | 2.1 km || 
|-id=941 bgcolor=#E9E9E9
| 565941 ||  || — || January 19, 2008 || Mount Lemmon || Mount Lemmon Survey ||  || align=right | 2.0 km || 
|-id=942 bgcolor=#E9E9E9
| 565942 ||  || — || June 3, 2013 || Kitt Peak || Spacewatch ||  || align=right data-sort-value="0.74" | 740 m || 
|-id=943 bgcolor=#E9E9E9
| 565943 ||  || — || November 16, 2006 || Kitt Peak || Spacewatch ||  || align=right | 2.1 km || 
|-id=944 bgcolor=#E9E9E9
| 565944 ||  || — || June 14, 2009 || Mount Lemmon || Mount Lemmon Survey ||  || align=right | 1.2 km || 
|-id=945 bgcolor=#E9E9E9
| 565945 ||  || — || April 12, 2008 || Palomar || Spacewatch ||  || align=right | 2.1 km || 
|-id=946 bgcolor=#E9E9E9
| 565946 ||  || — || December 18, 2007 || Mount Lemmon || Mount Lemmon Survey ||  || align=right data-sort-value="0.81" | 810 m || 
|-id=947 bgcolor=#E9E9E9
| 565947 ||  || — || February 10, 2007 || Catalina || CSS ||  || align=right | 3.1 km || 
|-id=948 bgcolor=#E9E9E9
| 565948 ||  || — || August 30, 2014 || Haleakala || Pan-STARRS ||  || align=right | 1.7 km || 
|-id=949 bgcolor=#E9E9E9
| 565949 ||  || — || February 20, 2012 || Haleakala || Pan-STARRS ||  || align=right | 1.5 km || 
|-id=950 bgcolor=#E9E9E9
| 565950 ||  || — || January 8, 2002 || Kitt Peak || Spacewatch ||  || align=right | 2.0 km || 
|-id=951 bgcolor=#E9E9E9
| 565951 ||  || — || March 16, 2012 || Kitt Peak || Spacewatch ||  || align=right | 1.8 km || 
|-id=952 bgcolor=#E9E9E9
| 565952 ||  || — || October 30, 2014 || Haleakala || Pan-STARRS ||  || align=right | 1.3 km || 
|-id=953 bgcolor=#E9E9E9
| 565953 ||  || — || December 12, 2014 || Haleakala || Pan-STARRS ||  || align=right | 1.5 km || 
|-id=954 bgcolor=#E9E9E9
| 565954 ||  || — || April 26, 2017 || Haleakala || Pan-STARRS ||  || align=right | 2.6 km || 
|-id=955 bgcolor=#E9E9E9
| 565955 ||  || — || April 26, 2017 || Haleakala || Pan-STARRS ||  || align=right | 1.3 km || 
|-id=956 bgcolor=#E9E9E9
| 565956 ||  || — || March 28, 2012 || Haleakala || Pan-STARRS ||  || align=right | 1.9 km || 
|-id=957 bgcolor=#E9E9E9
| 565957 ||  || — || June 30, 2005 || Kitt Peak || NEAT ||  || align=right | 1.1 km || 
|-id=958 bgcolor=#E9E9E9
| 565958 ||  || — || June 16, 2013 || Mount Lemmon || Mount Lemmon Survey ||  || align=right | 2.5 km || 
|-id=959 bgcolor=#E9E9E9
| 565959 ||  || — || February 16, 2012 || Haleakala || Pan-STARRS ||  || align=right | 1.6 km || 
|-id=960 bgcolor=#E9E9E9
| 565960 ||  || — || January 21, 2012 || Kitt Peak || Spacewatch ||  || align=right | 1.7 km || 
|-id=961 bgcolor=#E9E9E9
| 565961 ||  || — || January 4, 2016 || Haleakala || Pan-STARRS ||  || align=right | 1.4 km || 
|-id=962 bgcolor=#E9E9E9
| 565962 ||  || — || May 6, 2005 || Kitt Peak || Spacewatch ||  || align=right | 1.1 km || 
|-id=963 bgcolor=#E9E9E9
| 565963 ||  || — || June 8, 2013 || Mount Lemmon || Mount Lemmon Survey ||  || align=right | 2.2 km || 
|-id=964 bgcolor=#E9E9E9
| 565964 ||  || — || November 14, 2010 || Cerro Tololo || CSS ||  || align=right | 2.2 km || 
|-id=965 bgcolor=#E9E9E9
| 565965 ||  || — || May 8, 2013 || Haleakala || Pan-STARRS ||  || align=right | 1.4 km || 
|-id=966 bgcolor=#E9E9E9
| 565966 ||  || — || April 13, 2004 || Kitt Peak || Spacewatch ||  || align=right | 1.5 km || 
|-id=967 bgcolor=#E9E9E9
| 565967 ||  || — || April 25, 2004 || Kitt Peak || Spacewatch ||  || align=right | 1.3 km || 
|-id=968 bgcolor=#E9E9E9
| 565968 ||  || — || November 14, 2007 || Mount Lemmon || Mount Lemmon Survey ||  || align=right data-sort-value="0.95" | 950 m || 
|-id=969 bgcolor=#E9E9E9
| 565969 ||  || — || August 23, 2014 || Haleakala || Pan-STARRS ||  || align=right | 1.8 km || 
|-id=970 bgcolor=#E9E9E9
| 565970 ||  || — || April 7, 2008 || Mount Lemmon || Mount Lemmon Survey ||  || align=right | 1.7 km || 
|-id=971 bgcolor=#E9E9E9
| 565971 ||  || — || August 31, 2005 || Kitt Peak || Spacewatch ||  || align=right | 1.3 km || 
|-id=972 bgcolor=#E9E9E9
| 565972 ||  || — || October 27, 2014 || Haleakala || Pan-STARRS ||  || align=right | 1.7 km || 
|-id=973 bgcolor=#E9E9E9
| 565973 ||  || — || December 5, 2007 || Kitt Peak || Spacewatch ||  || align=right | 1.2 km || 
|-id=974 bgcolor=#E9E9E9
| 565974 ||  || — || May 16, 2013 || Haleakala || Pan-STARRS ||  || align=right | 1.2 km || 
|-id=975 bgcolor=#E9E9E9
| 565975 ||  || — || March 28, 2008 || Mount Lemmon || Mount Lemmon Survey ||  || align=right | 1.7 km || 
|-id=976 bgcolor=#E9E9E9
| 565976 ||  || — || December 8, 2010 || Kitt Peak || Spacewatch ||  || align=right | 2.1 km || 
|-id=977 bgcolor=#E9E9E9
| 565977 ||  || — || November 6, 2010 || Mount Lemmon || Mount Lemmon Survey ||  || align=right | 1.8 km || 
|-id=978 bgcolor=#E9E9E9
| 565978 ||  || — || September 27, 2009 || Kitt Peak || Spacewatch ||  || align=right | 1.9 km || 
|-id=979 bgcolor=#E9E9E9
| 565979 ||  || — || May 15, 2009 || Kitt Peak || Spacewatch ||  || align=right | 1.2 km || 
|-id=980 bgcolor=#E9E9E9
| 565980 ||  || — || November 12, 2010 || Mount Lemmon || Mount Lemmon Survey ||  || align=right | 1.9 km || 
|-id=981 bgcolor=#E9E9E9
| 565981 ||  || — || January 11, 2008 || Kitt Peak || Spacewatch ||  || align=right | 1.4 km || 
|-id=982 bgcolor=#E9E9E9
| 565982 ||  || — || December 18, 2015 || Mount Lemmon || Mount Lemmon Survey ||  || align=right data-sort-value="0.83" | 830 m || 
|-id=983 bgcolor=#E9E9E9
| 565983 ||  || — || December 18, 2007 || Mount Lemmon || Mount Lemmon Survey ||  || align=right data-sort-value="0.86" | 860 m || 
|-id=984 bgcolor=#d6d6d6
| 565984 ||  || — || September 16, 2003 || Kitt Peak || Spacewatch ||  || align=right | 2.0 km || 
|-id=985 bgcolor=#E9E9E9
| 565985 ||  || — || October 3, 2014 || Mount Lemmon || Mount Lemmon Survey ||  || align=right | 1.8 km || 
|-id=986 bgcolor=#E9E9E9
| 565986 ||  || — || June 7, 2013 || Haleakala || Pan-STARRS ||  || align=right | 1.1 km || 
|-id=987 bgcolor=#E9E9E9
| 565987 ||  || — || March 7, 2008 || Catalina || CSS ||  || align=right | 1.4 km || 
|-id=988 bgcolor=#E9E9E9
| 565988 ||  || — || October 31, 2006 || Mount Lemmon || Mount Lemmon Survey ||  || align=right | 1.7 km || 
|-id=989 bgcolor=#E9E9E9
| 565989 ||  || — || June 7, 2013 || Haleakala || Pan-STARRS ||  || align=right | 1.1 km || 
|-id=990 bgcolor=#E9E9E9
| 565990 ||  || — || October 25, 2005 || Kitt Peak || Spacewatch ||  || align=right | 1.9 km || 
|-id=991 bgcolor=#E9E9E9
| 565991 ||  || — || August 16, 2009 || Kitt Peak || Spacewatch ||  || align=right | 2.1 km || 
|-id=992 bgcolor=#E9E9E9
| 565992 ||  || — || May 18, 2009 || Mount Lemmon || Mount Lemmon Survey ||  || align=right | 1.3 km || 
|-id=993 bgcolor=#E9E9E9
| 565993 ||  || — || July 25, 2014 || Haleakala || Pan-STARRS ||  || align=right data-sort-value="0.87" | 870 m || 
|-id=994 bgcolor=#d6d6d6
| 565994 ||  || — || August 10, 2007 || Kitt Peak || Spacewatch ||  || align=right | 3.5 km || 
|-id=995 bgcolor=#d6d6d6
| 565995 ||  || — || February 6, 2011 || Les Engarouines || L. Bernasconi ||  || align=right | 3.7 km || 
|-id=996 bgcolor=#E9E9E9
| 565996 ||  || — || September 18, 2010 || Mount Lemmon || Mount Lemmon Survey ||  || align=right | 1.1 km || 
|-id=997 bgcolor=#E9E9E9
| 565997 ||  || — || March 30, 2008 || Kitt Peak || Spacewatch ||  || align=right | 1.0 km || 
|-id=998 bgcolor=#E9E9E9
| 565998 ||  || — || October 30, 2010 || Mount Lemmon || Mount Lemmon Survey ||  || align=right | 1.6 km || 
|-id=999 bgcolor=#E9E9E9
| 565999 ||  || — || February 28, 2012 || Haleakala || Pan-STARRS ||  || align=right | 1.5 km || 
|-id=000 bgcolor=#E9E9E9
| 566000 ||  || — || September 12, 2010 || Mount Lemmon || Mount Lemmon Survey ||  || align=right data-sort-value="0.91" | 910 m || 
|}

References

External links 
 Discovery Circumstances: Numbered Minor Planets (565001)–(570000) (IAU Minor Planet Center)

0565